= List of Lepidoptera of Croatia =

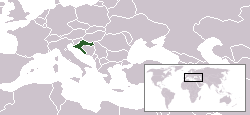
Location of Croatia

Lepidoptera of Croatia consist of both the butterflies and moths recorded from Croatia.

== Butterflies ==
=== Hesperiidae ===
- Carcharodus alceae (Esper, 1780)
- Carcharodus floccifera (Zeller, 1847)
- Carcharodus lavatherae (Esper, 1783)
- Carcharodus orientalis Reverdin, 1913
- Carterocephalus palaemon (Pallas, 1771)
- Erynnis tages (Linnaeus, 1758)
- Gegenes nostrodamus (Fabricius, 1793)
- Gegenes pumilio (Hoffmannsegg, 1804)
- Hesperia comma (Linnaeus, 1758)
- Heteropterus morpheus (Pallas, 1771)
- Ochlodes sylvanus (Esper, 1777)
- Pyrgus alveus (Hübner, 1803)
- Pyrgus armoricanus (Oberthur, 1910)
- Pyrgus carthami (Hübner, 1813)
- Pyrgus malvae (Linnaeus, 1758)
- Pyrgus onopordi (Rambur, 1839)
- Pyrgus serratulae (Rambur, 1839)
- Pyrgus sidae (Esper, 1784)
- Spialia orbifer (Hübner, 1823)
- Spialia sertorius (Hoffmannsegg, 1804)
- Thymelicus acteon (Rottemburg, 1775)
- Thymelicus lineola (Ochsenheimer, 1808)
- Thymelicus sylvestris (Poda, 1761)

=== Lycaenidae ===
- Agriades dardanus (Freyer, 1845)
- Aricia agestis (Denis & Schiffermuller, 1775)
- Aricia anteros (Freyer, 1838)
- Aricia artaxerxes (Fabricius, 1793)
- Callophrys rubi (Linnaeus, 1758)
- Celastrina argiolus (Linnaeus, 1758)
- Cupido minimus (Fuessly, 1775)
- Cupido osiris (Meigen, 1829)
- Cupido alcetas (Hoffmannsegg, 1804)
- Cupido argiades (Pallas, 1771)
- Cupido decolorata (Staudinger, 1886)
- Cyaniris semiargus (Rottemburg, 1775)
- Eumedonia eumedon (Esper, 1780)
- Favonius quercus (Linnaeus, 1758)
- Glaucopsyche alexis (Poda, 1761)
- Iolana iolas (Ochsenheimer, 1816)
- Lampides boeticus (Linnaeus, 1767)
- Leptotes pirithous (Linnaeus, 1767)
- Lycaena alciphron (Rottemburg, 1775)
- Lycaena candens (Herrich-Schäffer, 1844)
- Lycaena dispar (Haworth, 1802)
- Lycaena hippothoe (Linnaeus, 1761)
- Lycaena phlaeas (Linnaeus, 1761)
- Lycaena thersamon (Esper, 1784)
- Lycaena tityrus (Poda, 1761)
- Lycaena virgaureae (Linnaeus, 1758)
- Lysandra bellargus (Rottemburg, 1775)
- Lysandra coridon (Poda, 1761)
- Phengaris alcon (Denis & Schiffermuller, 1775)
- Phengaris arion (Linnaeus, 1758)
- Phengaris nausithous (Bergstrasser, 1779)
- Phengaris teleius (Bergstrasser, 1779)
- Plebejus argus (Linnaeus, 1758)
- Plebejus argyrognomon (Bergstrasser, 1779)
- Plebejus idas (Linnaeus, 1761)
- Polyommatus admetus (Esper, 1783)
- Polyommatus daphnis (Denis & Schiffermuller, 1775)
- Polyommatus amandus (Schneider, 1792)
- Polyommatus dorylas (Denis & Schiffermuller, 1775)
- Polyommatus eros (Ochsenheimer, 1808)
- Polyommatus escheri (Hübner, 1823)
- Polyommatus icarus (Rottemburg, 1775)
- Polyommatus thersites (Cantener, 1835)
- Pseudophilotes vicrama (Moore, 1865)
- Satyrium acaciae (Fabricius, 1787)
- Satyrium ilicis (Esper, 1779)
- Satyrium pruni (Linnaeus, 1758)
- Satyrium spini (Denis & Schiffermuller, 1775)
- Satyrium w-album (Knoch, 1782)
- Scolitantides orion (Pallas, 1771)
- Tarucus balkanica (Freyer, 1844)
- Thecla betulae (Linnaeus, 1758)

=== Nymphalidae ===
- Aglais io (Linnaeus, 1758)
- Aglais urticae (Linnaeus, 1758)
- Apatura ilia (Denis & Schiffermuller, 1775)
- Apatura iris (Linnaeus, 1758)
- Aphantopus hyperantus (Linnaeus, 1758)
- Araschnia levana (Linnaeus, 1758)
- Arethusana arethusa (Denis & Schiffermuller, 1775)
- Argynnis paphia (Linnaeus, 1758)
- Argynnis pandora (Denis & Schiffermuller, 1775)
- Boloria dia (Linnaeus, 1767)
- Boloria euphrosyne (Linnaeus, 1758)
- Boloria selene (Denis & Schiffermuller, 1775)
- Boloria titania (Esper, 1793)
- Brenthis daphne (Bergstrasser, 1780)
- Brenthis hecate (Denis & Schiffermuller, 1775)
- Brenthis ino (Rottemburg, 1775)
- Brintesia circe (Fabricius, 1775)
- Charaxes jasius (Linnaeus, 1767)
- Chazara briseis (Linnaeus, 1764)
- Coenonympha arcania (Linnaeus, 1761)
- Coenonympha glycerion (Borkhausen, 1788)
- Coenonympha oedippus (Fabricius, 1787)
- Coenonympha pamphilus (Linnaeus, 1758)
- Coenonympha rhodopensis Elwes, 1900
- Erebia aethiops (Esper, 1777)
- Erebia epiphron (Knoch, 1783)
- Erebia euryale (Esper, 1805)
- Erebia gorge (Hübner, 1804)
- Erebia ligea (Linnaeus, 1758)
- Erebia medusa (Denis & Schiffermuller, 1775)
- Erebia melas (Herbst, 1796)
- Erebia oeme (Hübner, 1804)
- Erebia ottomana Herrich-Schäffer, 1847
- Erebia pronoe (Esper, 1780)
- Erebia stirius (Godart, 1824)
- Euphydryas aurinia (Rottemburg, 1775)
- Euphydryas maturna (Linnaeus, 1758)
- Fabriciana adippe (Denis & Schiffermuller, 1775)
- Fabriciana niobe (Linnaeus, 1758)
- Hipparchia fagi (Scopoli, 1763)
- Hipparchia syriaca (Staudinger, 1871)
- Hipparchia statilinus (Hufnagel, 1766)
- Hipparchia semele (Linnaeus, 1758)
- Hyponephele lupinus (O. Costa, 1836)
- Hyponephele lycaon (Rottemburg, 1775)
- Issoria lathonia (Linnaeus, 1758)
- Kirinia roxelana (Cramer, 1777)
- Lasiommata maera (Linnaeus, 1758)
- Lasiommata megera (Linnaeus, 1767)
- Libythea celtis (Laicharting, 1782)
- Limenitis camilla (Linnaeus, 1764)
- Limenitis populi (Linnaeus, 1758)
- Limenitis reducta Staudinger, 1901
- Lopinga achine (Scopoli, 1763)
- Maniola jurtina (Linnaeus, 1758)
- Melanargia galathea (Linnaeus, 1758)
- Melanargia larissa (Geyer, 1828)
- Melitaea athalia (Rottemburg, 1775)
- Melitaea aurelia Nickerl, 1850
- Melitaea britomartis Assmann, 1847
- Melitaea cinxia (Linnaeus, 1758)
- Melitaea diamina (Lang, 1789)
- Melitaea didyma (Esper, 1778)
- Melitaea phoebe (Denis & Schiffermuller, 1775)
- Melitaea telona Fruhstorfer, 1908
- Minois dryas (Scopoli, 1763)
- Neptis rivularis (Scopoli, 1763)
- Neptis sappho (Pallas, 1771)
- Nymphalis antiopa (Linnaeus, 1758)
- Nymphalis polychloros (Linnaeus, 1758)
- Nymphalis vaualbum (Denis & Schiffermuller, 1775)
- Nymphalis xanthomelas (Esper, 1781)
- Pararge aegeria (Linnaeus, 1758)
- Polygonia c-album (Linnaeus, 1758)
- Polygonia egea (Cramer, 1775)
- Proterebia afra (Fabricius, 1787)
- Pyronia cecilia (Vallantin, 1894)
- Pyronia tithonus (Linnaeus, 1767)
- Satyrus ferula (Fabricius, 1793)
- Speyeria aglaja (Linnaeus, 1758)
- Vanessa atalanta (Linnaeus, 1758)
- Vanessa cardui (Linnaeus, 1758)

=== Papilionidae ===
- Iphiclides podalirius (Linnaeus, 1758)
- Papilio alexanor Esper, 1800
- Papilio machaon Linnaeus, 1758
- Parnassius apollo (Linnaeus, 1758)
- Parnassius mnemosyne (Linnaeus, 1758)
- Zerynthia polyxena (Denis & Schiffermuller, 1775)

=== Pieridae ===
- Anthocharis cardamines (Linnaeus, 1758)
- Aporia crataegi (Linnaeus, 1758)
- Colias alfacariensis Ribbe, 1905
- Colias croceus (Fourcroy, 1785)
- Colias hyale (Linnaeus, 1758)
- Colias myrmidone (Esper, 1781)
- Euchloe ausonia (Hübner, 1804)
- Gonepteryx cleopatra (Linnaeus, 1767)
- Gonepteryx rhamni (Linnaeus, 1758)
- Leptidea morsei (Fenton, 1882)
- Leptidea sinapis (Linnaeus, 1758)
- Pieris balcana Lorkovic, 1970
- Pieris brassicae (Linnaeus, 1758)
- Pieris ergane (Geyer, 1828)
- Pieris mannii (Mayer, 1851)
- Pieris napi (Linnaeus, 1758)
- Pieris rapae (Linnaeus, 1758)
- Pontia edusa (Fabricius, 1777)

=== Riodinidae ===
- Hamearis lucina (Linnaeus, 1758)

== Moths ==
=== Adelidae ===
- Adela croesella (Scopoli, 1763)
- Adela cuprella (Denis & Schiffermuller, 1775)
- Adela reaumurella (Linnaeus, 1758)
- Cauchas fibulella (Denis & Schiffermuller, 1775)
- Cauchas leucocerella (Scopoli, 1763)
- Cauchas rufifrontella (Treitschke, 1833)
- Cauchas rufimitrella (Scopoli, 1763)
- Nematopogon adansoniella (Villers, 1789)
- Nematopogon pilella (Denis & Schiffermuller, 1775)
- Nematopogon robertella (Clerck, 1759)
- Nematopogon swammerdamella (Linnaeus, 1758)
- Nemophora barbatellus (Zeller, 1847)
- Nemophora cupriacella (Hübner, 1819)
- Nemophora degeerella (Linnaeus, 1758)
- Nemophora istrianellus (Heydenreich, 1851)
- Nemophora metallica (Poda, 1761)
- Nemophora minimella (Denis & Schiffermuller, 1775)
- Nemophora pfeifferella (Hübner, 1813)

=== Alucitidae ===
- Alucita bidentata Scholz & Jackh, 1994
- Alucita cancellata (Meyrick, 1908)
- Alucita cymatodactyla Zeller, 1852
- Alucita grammodactyla Zeller, 1841
- Alucita huebneri Wallengren, 1859
- Alucita major (Rebel, 1906)
- Alucita zonodactyla Zeller, 1847
- Pterotopteryx dodecadactyla Hübner, 1813

=== Argyresthiidae ===
- Argyresthia abdominalis Zeller, 1839
- Argyresthia bonnetella (Linnaeus, 1758)
- Argyresthia fundella (Fischer von Röslerstamm, 1835)
- Argyresthia goedartella (Linnaeus, 1758)
- Argyresthia prenjella Rebel, 1901
- Argyresthia pruniella (Clerck, 1759)
- Argyresthia semifusca (Haworth, 1828)
- Argyresthia semitestacella (Curtis, 1833)
- Argyresthia sorbiella (Treitschke, 1833)
- Argyresthia spinosella Stainton, 1849
- Argyresthia arceuthina Zeller, 1839
- Argyresthia illuminatella Zeller, 1839

=== Autostichidae ===
- Apatema apolausticum Gozmany, 1996
- Aprominta designatella (Herrich-Schäffer, 1855)
- Dysspastus undecimpunctella (Mann, 1864)
- Holcopogon bubulcellus (Staudinger, 1859)
- Nukusa cinerella (Rebel, 1941)
- Nukusa praeditella (Rebel, 1891)
- Oegoconia caradjai Popescu-Gorj & Capuse, 1965
- Oegoconia huemeri Sutter, 2007
- Oegoconia novimundi (Busck, 1915)
- Pantacordis pales Gozmany, 1954
- Symmoca albicanella Zeller, 1868
- Symmoca signatella Herrich-Schäffer, 1854
- Symmoca signella (Hübner, 1796)

=== Bedelliidae ===
- Bedellia ehikella Szocs, 1967
- Bedellia somnulentella (Zeller, 1847)

=== Blastobasidae ===
- Blastobasis huemeri Sinev, 1993
- Blastobasis phycidella (Zeller, 1839)
- Xenopathia novaki (Rebel, 1891)

=== Brachodidae ===
- Brachodes compar (Staudinger, 1879)
- Brachodes nana (Treitschke, 1834)

=== Brahmaeidae ===
- Lemonia balcanica (Herrich-Schäffer, 1847)
- Lemonia dumi (Linnaeus, 1761)
- Lemonia taraxaci (Denis & Schiffermuller, 1775)

=== Bucculatricidae ===
- Bucculatrix albedinella (Zeller, 1839)
- Bucculatrix albella Stainton, 1867
- Bucculatrix bechsteinella (Bechstein & Scharfenberg, 1805)
- Bucculatrix cidarella (Zeller, 1839)
- Bucculatrix demaryella (Duponchel, 1840)
- Bucculatrix frangutella (Goeze, 1783)
- Bucculatrix helichrysella Constant, 1889
- Bucculatrix herbalbella Chretien, 1915
- Bucculatrix infans Staudinger, 1880
- Bucculatrix nigricomella (Zeller, 1839)
- Bucculatrix thoracella (Thunberg, 1794)
- Bucculatrix ulmella Zeller, 1848
- Bucculatrix ulmifoliae M. Hering, 1931
- Bucculatrix zizyphella Chretien, 1907

=== Carposinidae ===
- Carposina berberidella Herrich-Schäffer, 1854

=== Chimabachidae ===
- Dasystoma salicella (Hübner, 1796)
- Diurnea fagella (Denis & Schiffermuller, 1775)

=== Choreutidae ===
- Anthophila fabriciana (Linnaeus, 1767)
- Choreutis nemorana (Hübner, 1799)
- Choreutis pariana (Clerck, 1759)
- Prochoreutis myllerana (Fabricius, 1794)
- Tebenna bjerkandrella (Thunberg, 1784)
- Tebenna micalis (Mann, 1857)
- Tebenna pretiosana (Duponchel, 1842)

=== Cimeliidae ===
- Axia margarita (Hübner, 1813)

=== Coleophoridae ===
- Coleophora acrisella Milliere, 1872
- Coleophora adelogrammella Zeller, 1849
- Coleophora adspersella Benander, 1939
- Coleophora albella (Thunberg, 1788)
- Coleophora albicostella (Duponchel, 1842)
- Coleophora albitarsella Zeller, 1849
- Coleophora alcyonipennella (Kollar, 1832)
- Coleophora aleramica Baldizzone & Stubner, 2007
- Coleophora alticolella Zeller, 1849
- Coleophora anatipenella (Hübner, 1796)
- Coleophora angustiorella Fuchs, 1903
- Coleophora argentula (Stephens, 1834)
- Coleophora astragalella Zeller, 1849
- Coleophora auricella (Fabricius, 1794)
- Coleophora badiipennella (Duponchel, 1843)
- Coleophora bilineatella Zeller, 1849
- Coleophora caespititiella Zeller, 1839
- Coleophora calycotomella Stainton, 1869
- Coleophora cecidophorella Oudejans, 1972
- Coleophora chamaedriella Bruand, 1852
- Coleophora colutella (Fabricius, 1794)
- Coleophora conspicuella Zeller, 1849
- Coleophora conyzae Zeller, 1868
- Coleophora coracipennella (Hübner, 1796)
- Coleophora coronillae Zeller, 1849
- Coleophora currucipennella Zeller, 1839
- Coleophora deauratella Lienig & Zeller, 1846
- Coleophora dianthi Herrich-Schäffer, 1855
- Coleophora directella Zeller, 1849
- Coleophora ditella Zeller, 1849
- Coleophora drymidis Mann, 1857
- Coleophora flaviella Mann, 1857
- Coleophora flavipennella (Duponchel, 1843)
- Coleophora follicularis (Vallot, 1802)
- Coleophora frankii Schmidt, 1886
- Coleophora galbulipennella Zeller, 1838
- Coleophora gardesanella Toll, 1954
- Coleophora glaucicolella Wood, 1892
- Coleophora graminicolella Heinemann, 1876
- Coleophora gryphipennella (Hübner, 1796)
- Coleophora halophilella Zimmermann, 1926
- Coleophora hartigi Toll, 1944
- Coleophora helichrysiella Krone, 1909
- Coleophora hemerobiella (Scopoli, 1763)
- Coleophora hieronella Zeller, 1849
- Coleophora ibipennella Zeller, 1849
- Coleophora insulicola Toll, 1942
- Coleophora inulae Wocke, 1877
- Coleophora kuehnella (Goeze, 1783)
- Coleophora laricella (Hübner, 1817)
- Coleophora lessinica Baldizzone, 1980
- Coleophora limosipennella (Duponchel, 1843)
- Coleophora lineolea (Haworth, 1828)
- Coleophora linosyridella Fuchs, 1880
- Coleophora lithargyrinella Zeller, 1849
- Coleophora lixella Zeller, 1849
- Coleophora lutipennella (Zeller, 1838)
- Coleophora macedonica Toll, 1959
- Coleophora maritimella Newman, 1863
- Coleophora mayrella (Hübner, 1813)
- Coleophora medelichensis Krone, 1908
- Coleophora meridionella Rebel, 1912
- Coleophora milvipennis Zeller, 1839
- Coleophora niveicostella Zeller, 1839
- Coleophora nutantella Muhlig & Frey, 1857
- Coleophora obtectella Zeller, 1849
- Coleophora obviella Rebel, 1914
- Coleophora ochrea (Haworth, 1828)
- Coleophora onobrychiella Zeller, 1849
- Coleophora ononidella Milliere, 1879
- Coleophora oriolella Zeller, 1849
- Coleophora ornatipennella (Hübner, 1796)
- Coleophora otidipennella (Hübner, 1817)
- Coleophora paripennella Zeller, 1839
- Coleophora partitella Zeller, 1849
- Coleophora pennella (Denis & Schiffermuller, 1775)
- Coleophora preisseckeri Toll, 1942
- Coleophora prunifoliae Doets, 1944
- Coleophora pseudociconiella Toll, 1952
- Coleophora pseudolinosyris Kasy, 1979
- Coleophora pseudorepentis Toll, 1960
- Coleophora ptarmicia Walsingham, 1910
- Coleophora pyrrhulipennella Zeller, 1839
- Coleophora quadristraminella Toll, 1961
- Coleophora salicorniae Heinemann & Wocke, 1877
- Coleophora saponariella Heeger, 1848
- Coleophora saxicolella (Duponchel, 1843)
- Coleophora serpylletorum Hering, 1889
- Coleophora serratella (Linnaeus, 1761)
- Coleophora silenella Herrich-Schäffer, 1855
- Coleophora soffneriella Toll, 1961
- Coleophora spinella (Schrank, 1802)
- Coleophora spumosella Staudinger, 1859
- Coleophora squalorella Zeller, 1849
- Coleophora squamella Constant, 1885
- Coleophora sternipennella (Zetterstedt, 1839)
- Coleophora striolatella Zeller, 1849
- Coleophora taeniipennella Herrich-Schäffer, 1855
- Coleophora tamesis Waters, 1929
- Coleophora tauricella Staudinger, 1880
- Coleophora therinella Tengstrom, 1848
- Coleophora thurneri Glaser, 1969
- Coleophora trifariella Zeller, 1849
- Coleophora trifolii (Curtis, 1832)
- Coleophora trigeminella Fuchs, 1881
- Coleophora trochilella (Duponchel, 1843)
- Coleophora tyrrhaenica Amsel, 1951
- Coleophora uralensis Toll, 1961
- Coleophora valesianella Zeller, 1849
- Coleophora variicornis Toll, 1952
- Coleophora versurella Zeller, 1849
- Coleophora vestianella (Linnaeus, 1758)
- Coleophora vibicella (Hübner, 1813)
- Coleophora vibicigerella Zeller, 1839
- Coleophora vicinella Zeller, 1849
- Coleophora vulnerariae Zeller, 1839
- Coleophora wockeella Zeller, 1849
- Coleophora zelleriella Heinemann, 1854
- Goniodoma nemesi Capuse, 1970

=== Cosmopterigidae ===
- Cosmopterix coryphaea Walsingham, 1908
- Cosmopterix orichalcea Stainton, 1861
- Cosmopterix pulchrimella Chambers, 1875
- Cosmopterix scribaiella Zeller, 1850
- Cosmopterix zieglerella (Hübner, 1810)
- Eteobalea albiapicella (Duponchel, 1843)
- Eteobalea anonymella (Riedl, 1965)
- Eteobalea dohrnii (Zeller, 1847)
- Eteobalea intermediella (Riedl, 1966)
- Eteobalea isabellella (O. G. Costa, 1836)
- Eteobalea serratella (Treitschke, 1833)
- Eteobalea sumptuosella (Lederer, 1855)
- Eteobalea tririvella (Staudinger, 1870)
- Hodgesiella rebeli (Krone, 1905)
- Limnaecia phragmitella Stainton, 1851
- Pancalia leuwenhoekella (Linnaeus, 1761)
- Pancalia nodosella (Bruand, 1851)
- Pancalia schwarzella (Fabricius, 1798)
- Pyroderces argyrogrammos (Zeller, 1847)
- Pyroderces caesaris Gozmany, 1957
- Sorhagenia janiszewskae Riedl, 1962
- Sorhagenia lophyrella (Douglas, 1846)
- Sorhagenia rhamniella (Zeller, 1839)
- Vulcaniella cognatella Riedl, 1990
- Vulcaniella extremella (Wocke, 1871)
- Vulcaniella fiordalisa (Petry, 1904)
- Vulcaniella grabowiella (Staudinger, 1859)
- Vulcaniella pomposella (Zeller, 1839)

=== Cossidae ===
- Cossus cossus (Linnaeus, 1758)
- Dyspessa ulula (Borkhausen, 1790)
- Parahypopta caestrum (Hübner, 1808)
- Phragmataecia castaneae (Hübner, 1790)
- Zeuzera pyrina (Linnaeus, 1761)

=== Crambidae ===
- Achyra nudalis (Hübner, 1796)
- Agriphila brioniellus (Zerny, 1914)
- Agriphila dalmatinellus (Hampson, 1900)
- Agriphila geniculea (Haworth, 1811)
- Agriphila inquinatella (Denis & Schiffermuller, 1775)
- Agriphila latistria (Haworth, 1811)
- Agriphila paleatellus (Zeller, 1847)
- Agriphila poliellus (Treitschke, 1832)
- Agriphila selasella (Hübner, 1813)
- Agriphila straminella (Denis & Schiffermuller, 1775)
- Agriphila tersellus (Lederer, 1855)
- Agriphila tristella (Denis & Schiffermuller, 1775)
- Agrotera nemoralis (Scopoli, 1763)
- Anania coronata (Hufnagel, 1767)
- Anania crocealis (Hübner, 1796)
- Anania funebris (Strom, 1768)
- Anania fuscalis (Denis & Schiffermuller, 1775)
- Anania hortulata (Linnaeus, 1758)
- Anania lancealis (Denis & Schiffermuller, 1775)
- Anania luctualis (Hübner, 1793)
- Anania perlucidalis (Hübner, 1809)
- Anania stachydalis (Germar, 1821)
- Anania terrealis (Treitschke, 1829)
- Anania testacealis (Zeller, 1847)
- Anania verbascalis (Denis & Schiffermuller, 1775)
- Anarpia incertalis (Duponchel, 1832)
- Ancylolomia palpella (Denis & Schiffermuller, 1775)
- Ancylolomia pectinatellus (Zeller, 1847)
- Ancylolomia tentaculella (Hübner, 1796)
- Antigastra catalaunalis (Duponchel, 1833)
- Aporodes floralis (Hübner, 1809)
- Atralata albofascialis (Treitschke, 1829)
- Calamotropha paludella (Hübner, 1824)
- Cataclysta lemnata (Linnaeus, 1758)
- Catoptria acutangulellus (Herrich-Schäffer, 1847)
- Catoptria falsella (Denis & Schiffermuller, 1775)
- Catoptria languidellus (Zeller, 1863)
- Catoptria lythargyrella (Hübner, 1796)
- Catoptria margaritella (Denis & Schiffermuller, 1775)
- Catoptria myella (Hübner, 1796)
- Catoptria mytilella (Hübner, 1805)
- Catoptria petrificella (Hübner, 1796)
- Catoptria pinella (Linnaeus, 1758)
- Catoptria verellus (Zincken, 1817)
- Chilo phragmitella (Hübner, 1805)
- Cholius luteolaris (Scopoli, 1772)
- Chrysocrambus craterella (Scopoli, 1763)
- Chrysocrambus linetella (Fabricius, 1781)
- Chrysoteuchia culmella (Linnaeus, 1758)
- Cornifrons ulceratalis Lederer, 1858
- Crambus lathoniellus (Zincken, 1817)
- Crambus pascuella (Linnaeus, 1758)
- Crambus perlella (Scopoli, 1763)
- Crambus pratella (Linnaeus, 1758)
- Crambus silvella (Hübner, 1813)
- Cybalomia lutosalis (Mann, 1862)
- Cynaeda dentalis (Denis & Schiffermuller, 1775)
- Cynaeda gigantea (Wocke, 1871)
- Diasemia reticularis (Linnaeus, 1761)
- Diasemiopsis ramburialis (Duponchel, 1834)
- Dolicharthria bruguieralis (Duponchel, 1833)
- Dolicharthria punctalis (Denis & Schiffermuller, 1775)
- Dolicharthria stigmosalis (Herrich-Schäffer, 1848)
- Donacaula forficella (Thunberg, 1794)
- Donacaula mucronella (Denis & Schiffermuller, 1775)
- Duponchelia fovealis Zeller, 1847
- Ecpyrrhorrhoe diffusalis (Guenee, 1854)
- Ecpyrrhorrhoe rubiginalis (Hübner, 1796)
- Elophila nymphaeata (Linnaeus, 1758)
- Elophila rivulalis (Duponchel, 1834)
- Euchromius bella (Hübner, 1796)
- Euchromius cambridgei (Zeller, 1867)
- Euchromius ocellea (Haworth, 1811)
- Euchromius ramburiellus (Duponchel, 1836)
- Euchromius superbellus (Zeller, 1849)
- Eudonia angustea (Curtis, 1827)
- Eudonia delunella (Stainton, 1849)
- Eudonia lacustrata (Panzer, 1804)
- Eudonia mercurella (Linnaeus, 1758)
- Eudonia phaeoleuca (Zeller, 1846)
- Eudonia truncicolella (Stainton, 1849)
- Eudonia vallesialis (Duponchel, 1832)
- Eurrhypis guttulalis (Herrich-Schäffer, 1848)
- Eurrhypis pollinalis (Denis & Schiffermuller, 1775)
- Evergestis aenealis (Denis & Schiffermuller, 1775)
- Evergestis caesialis (Herrich-Schäffer, 1849)
- Evergestis extimalis (Scopoli, 1763)
- Evergestis forficalis (Linnaeus, 1758)
- Evergestis frumentalis (Linnaeus, 1761)
- Evergestis isatidalis (Duponchel, 1833)
- Evergestis limbata (Linnaeus, 1767)
- Evergestis pallidata (Hufnagel, 1767)
- Evergestis politalis (Denis & Schiffermuller, 1775)
- Evergestis sophialis (Fabricius, 1787)
- Heliothela wulfeniana (Scopoli, 1763)
- Hellula undalis (Fabricius, 1781)
- Hodebertia testalis (Fabricius, 1794)
- Hydriris ornatalis (Duponchel, 1832)
- Hyperlais argillacealis (Zeller, 1847)
- Hyperlais dulcinalis (Treitschke, 1835)
- Loxostege aeruginalis (Hübner, 1796)
- Loxostege clathralis (Hübner, 1813)
- Loxostege comptalis (Freyer, 1848)
- Loxostege deliblatica Szent-Ivany & Uhrik-Meszaros, 1942
- Loxostege fascialis (Hübner, 1796)
- Loxostege sticticalis (Linnaeus, 1761)
- Loxostege turbidalis (Treitschke, 1829)
- Loxostege virescalis (Guenee, 1854)
- Mecyna asinalis (Hübner, 1819)
- Mecyna flavalis (Denis & Schiffermuller, 1775)
- Mecyna trinalis (Denis & Schiffermuller, 1775)
- Mesocrambus candiellus (Herrich-Schäffer, 1848)
- Metacrambus carectellus (Zeller, 1847)
- Metasia carnealis (Treitschke, 1829)
- Metasia corsicalis (Duponchel, 1833)
- Metasia ophialis (Treitschke, 1829)
- Metasia suppandalis (Hübner, 1823)
- Nomophila noctuella (Denis & Schiffermuller, 1775)
- Nymphula nitidulata (Hufnagel, 1767)
- Ostrinia nubilalis (Hübner, 1796)
- Palpita vitrealis (Rossi, 1794)
- Paracorsia repandalis (Denis & Schiffermuller, 1775)
- Parapoynx stratiotata (Linnaeus, 1758)
- Paratalanta hyalinalis (Hübner, 1796)
- Paratalanta pandalis (Hübner, 1825)
- Pediasia aridella (Thunberg, 1788)
- Pediasia contaminella (Hübner, 1796)
- Pediasia fascelinella (Hübner, 1813)
- Pediasia jucundellus (Herrich-Schäffer, 1847)
- Pediasia luteella (Denis & Schiffermuller, 1775)
- Pediasia siculellus (Duponchel, 1836)
- Platytes alpinella (Hübner, 1813)
- Platytes cerussella (Denis & Schiffermuller, 1775)
- Pleuroptya balteata (Fabricius, 1798)
- Pleuroptya ruralis (Scopoli, 1763)
- Psammotis pulveralis (Hübner, 1796)
- Pyrausta aurata (Scopoli, 1763)
- Pyrausta castalis Treitschke, 1829
- Pyrausta cingulata (Linnaeus, 1758)
- Pyrausta coracinalis Leraut, 1982
- Pyrausta despicata (Scopoli, 1763)
- Pyrausta nigrata (Scopoli, 1763)
- Pyrausta obfuscata (Scopoli, 1763)
- Pyrausta ostrinalis (Hübner, 1796)
- Pyrausta purpuralis (Linnaeus, 1758)
- Pyrausta sanguinalis (Linnaeus, 1767)
- Pyrausta virginalis Duponchel, 1832
- Scirpophaga praelata (Scopoli, 1763)
- Sclerocona acutella (Eversmann, 1842)
- Scoparia ambigualis (Treitschke, 1829)
- Scoparia basistrigalis Knaggs, 1866
- Scoparia ingratella (Zeller, 1846)
- Scoparia manifestella (Herrich-Schäffer, 1848)
- Scoparia perplexella (Zeller, 1839)
- Scoparia pyralella (Denis & Schiffermuller, 1775)
- Scoparia subfusca Haworth, 1811
- Sitochroa palealis (Denis & Schiffermuller, 1775)
- Sitochroa verticalis (Linnaeus, 1758)
- Talis quercella (Denis & Schiffermuller, 1775)
- Tegostoma comparalis (Hübner, 1796)
- Thisanotia chrysonuchella (Scopoli, 1763)
- Titanio normalis (Hübner, 1796)
- Udea ferrugalis (Hübner, 1796)
- Udea fimbriatralis (Duponchel, 1834)
- Udea fulvalis (Hübner, 1809)
- Udea languidalis (Eversmann, 1842)
- Udea nebulalis (Hübner, 1796)
- Udea numeralis (Hübner, 1796)
- Udea olivalis (Denis & Schiffermuller, 1775)
- Udea prunalis (Denis & Schiffermuller, 1775)
- Uresiphita gilvata (Fabricius, 1794)
- Xanthocrambus lucellus (Herrich-Schäffer, 1848)
- Xanthocrambus saxonellus (Zincken, 1821)

=== Douglasiidae ===
- Klimeschia transversella (Zeller, 1839)
- Tinagma balteolella (Fischer von Röslerstamm, 1841)
- Tinagma perdicella Zeller, 1839

=== Drepanidae ===
- Asphalia ruficollis (Denis & Schiffermuller, 1775)
- Cilix glaucata (Scopoli, 1763)
- Cymatophorina diluta (Denis & Schiffermuller, 1775)
- Drepana falcataria (Linnaeus, 1758)
- Habrosyne pyritoides (Hufnagel, 1766)
- Polyploca ridens (Fabricius, 1787)
- Tethea ocularis (Linnaeus, 1767)
- Tethea or (Denis & Schiffermuller, 1775)
- Thyatira batis (Linnaeus, 1758)
- Watsonalla binaria (Hufnagel, 1767)
- Watsonalla cultraria (Fabricius, 1775)
- Watsonalla uncinula (Borkhausen, 1790)

=== Elachistidae ===
- Agonopterix adspersella (Kollar, 1832)
- Agonopterix alstromeriana (Clerck, 1759)
- Agonopterix arenella (Denis & Schiffermuller, 1775)
- Agonopterix assimilella (Treitschke, 1832)
- Agonopterix atomella (Denis & Schiffermuller, 1775)
- Agonopterix capreolella (Zeller, 1839)
- Agonopterix crassiventrella (Rebel, 1891)
- Agonopterix doronicella (Wocke, 1849)
- Agonopterix furvella (Treitschke, 1832)
- Agonopterix irrorata (Staudinger, 1870)
- Agonopterix kaekeritziana (Linnaeus, 1767)
- Agonopterix laterella (Denis & Schiffermuller, 1775)
- Agonopterix nanatella (Stainton, 1849)
- Agonopterix nervosa (Haworth, 1811)
- Agonopterix parilella (Treitschke, 1835)
- Agonopterix purpurea (Haworth, 1811)
- Agonopterix rutana (Fabricius, 1794)
- Agonopterix selini (Heinemann, 1870)
- Agonopterix squamosa (Mann, 1864)
- Anchinia daphnella (Denis & Schiffermuller, 1775)
- Blastodacna atra (Haworth, 1828)
- Blastodacna hellerella (Duponchel, 1838)
- Cacochroa permixtella (Herrich-Schäffer, 1854)
- Depressaria cervicella Herrich-Schäffer, 1854
- Depressaria douglasella Stainton, 1849
- Depressaria marcella Rebel, 1901
- Depressaria tenebricosa Zeller, 1854
- Depressaria veneficella Zeller, 1847
- Depressaria hirtipalpis Zeller, 1854
- Depressaria dictamnella (Treitschke, 1835)
- Dystebenna stephensi (Stainton, 1849)
- Elachista argentella (Clerck, 1759)
- Elachista catalana Parenti, 1978
- Elachista chrysodesmella Zeller, 1850
- Elachista constitella Frey, 1859
- Elachista graeca Parenti, 2002
- Elachista metella Kaila, 2002
- Elachista revinctella Zeller, 1850
- Elachista vegliae Parenti, 1978
- Elachista biatomella (Stainton, 1848)
- Elachista occidentalis Frey, 1882
- Ethmia chrysopyga (Zeller, 1844)
- Exaeretia lutosella (Herrich-Schäffer, 1854)
- Haplochrois ochraceella (Rebel, 1903)
- Heinemannia festivella (Denis & Schiffermuller, 1775)
- Hypercallia citrinalis (Scopoli, 1763)
- Luquetia lobella (Denis & Schiffermuller, 1775)
- Orophia denisella (Denis & Schiffermuller, 1775)
- Orophia ferrugella (Denis & Schiffermuller, 1775)
- Orophia sordidella (Hübner, 1796)
- Orophia zernyi (Szent-Ivany, 1942)
- Perittia huemeri (Traugott-Olsen, 1990)
- Semioscopis steinkellneriana (Denis & Schiffermuller, 1775)
- Spuleria flavicaput (Haworth, 1828)

=== Endromidae ===
- Endromis versicolora (Linnaeus, 1758)

=== Epermeniidae ===
- Epermenia aequidentellus (E. Hofmann, 1867)
- Epermenia chaerophyllella (Goeze, 1783)
- Epermenia illigerella (Hübner, 1813)
- Epermenia insecurella (Stainton, 1854)
- Epermenia petrusellus (Heylaerts, 1883)
- Epermenia strictellus (Wocke, 1867)
- Epermenia iniquellus (Wocke, 1867)
- Epermenia ochreomaculellus (Milliere, 1854)
- Epermenia pontificella (Hübner, 1796)
- Epermenia scurella (Stainton, 1851)
- Ochromolopis ictella (Hübner, 1813)
- Ochromolopis staintonellus (Milliere, 1869)
- Phaulernis fulviguttella (Zeller, 1839)
- Phaulernis rebeliella Gaedike, 1966

=== Erebidae ===
- Amata kruegeri (Ragusa, 1904)
- Amata phegea (Linnaeus, 1758)
- Apopestes spectrum (Esper, 1787)
- Arctia caja (Linnaeus, 1758)
- Arctia festiva (Hufnagel, 1766)
- Arctia villica (Linnaeus, 1758)
- Arctornis l-nigrum (Muller, 1764)
- Atolmis rubricollis (Linnaeus, 1758)
- Autophila dilucida (Hübner, 1808)
- Autophila limbata (Staudinger, 1871)
- Autophila anaphanes Boursin, 1940
- Callimorpha dominula (Linnaeus, 1758)
- Calliteara pudibunda (Linnaeus, 1758)
- Calymma communimacula (Denis & Schiffermuller, 1775)
- Calyptra thalictri (Borkhausen, 1790)
- Catephia alchymista (Denis & Schiffermuller, 1775)
- Catocala coniuncta (Esper, 1787)
- Catocala conversa (Esper, 1783)
- Catocala dilecta (Hübner, 1808)
- Catocala disjuncta (Geyer, 1828)
- Catocala diversa (Geyer, 1828)
- Catocala electa (Vieweg, 1790)
- Catocala elocata (Esper, 1787)
- Catocala fraxini (Linnaeus, 1758)
- Catocala fulminea (Scopoli, 1763)
- Catocala hymenaea (Denis & Schiffermuller, 1775)
- Catocala lupina Herrich-Schäffer, 1851
- Catocala nupta (Linnaeus, 1767)
- Catocala nymphaea (Esper, 1787)
- Catocala nymphagoga (Esper, 1787)
- Catocala promissa (Denis & Schiffermuller, 1775)
- Catocala puerpera (Giorna, 1791)
- Catocala sponsa (Linnaeus, 1767)
- Clytie syriaca (Bugnion, 1837)
- Colobochyla salicalis (Denis & Schiffermuller, 1775)
- Coscinia striata (Linnaeus, 1758)
- Cybosia mesomella (Linnaeus, 1758)
- Cymbalophora pudica (Esper, 1785)
- Diacrisia sannio (Linnaeus, 1758)
- Diaphora luctuosa (Hübner, 1831)
- Diaphora mendica (Clerck, 1759)
- Dicallomera fascelina (Linnaeus, 1758)
- Drasteria cailino (Lefebvre, 1827)
- Dysauxes ancilla (Linnaeus, 1767)
- Dysauxes famula (Freyer, 1836)
- Dysauxes punctata (Fabricius, 1781)
- Dysgonia algira (Linnaeus, 1767)
- Dysgonia torrida (Guenee, 1852)
- Eilema caniola (Hübner, 1808)
- Eilema complana (Linnaeus, 1758)
- Eilema depressa (Esper, 1787)
- Eilema lurideola (Zincken, 1817)
- Eilema lutarella (Linnaeus, 1758)
- Eilema palliatella (Scopoli, 1763)
- Eilema pseudocomplana (Daniel, 1939)
- Eilema pygmaeola (Doubleday, 1847)
- Eilema sororcula (Hufnagel, 1766)
- Eublemma amoena (Hübner, 1803)
- Eublemma candidana (Fabricius, 1794)
- Eublemma himmighoffeni (Milliere, 1867)
- Eublemma minutata (Fabricius, 1794)
- Eublemma ostrina (Hübner, 1808)
- Eublemma parva (Hübner, 1808)
- Eublemma polygramma (Duponchel, 1842)
- Eublemma purpurina (Denis & Schiffermuller, 1775)
- Eublemma scitula Rambur, 1833
- Eublemma viridula (Guenee, 1841)
- Euclidia mi (Clerck, 1759)
- Euclidia glyphica (Linnaeus, 1758)
- Euclidia triquetra (Denis & Schiffermuller, 1775)
- Euplagia quadripunctaria (Poda, 1761)
- Euproctis chrysorrhoea (Linnaeus, 1758)
- Euproctis similis (Fuessly, 1775)
- Exophyla rectangularis (Geyer, 1828)
- Grammodes bifasciata (Petagna, 1787)
- Grammodes stolida (Fabricius, 1775)
- Herminia grisealis (Denis & Schiffermuller, 1775)
- Herminia tarsicrinalis (Knoch, 1782)
- Herminia tarsipennalis (Treitschke, 1835)
- Herminia tenuialis (Rebel, 1899)
- Hypena crassalis (Fabricius, 1787)
- Hypena obesalis Treitschke, 1829
- Hypena obsitalis (Hübner, 1813)
- Hypena palpalis (Hübner, 1796)
- Hypena proboscidalis (Linnaeus, 1758)
- Hypena rostralis (Linnaeus, 1758)
- Hypenodes humidalis Doubleday, 1850
- Hyphantria cunea (Drury, 1773)
- Hyphoraia aulica (Linnaeus, 1758)
- Idia calvaria (Denis & Schiffermuller, 1775)
- Laelia coenosa (Hübner, 1808)
- Laspeyria flexula (Denis & Schiffermuller, 1775)
- Leucoma salicis (Linnaeus, 1758)
- Lithosia quadra (Linnaeus, 1758)
- Lygephila craccae (Denis & Schiffermuller, 1775)
- Lygephila lusoria (Linnaeus, 1758)
- Lygephila pastinum (Treitschke, 1826)
- Lygephila procax (Hübner, 1813)
- Lygephila viciae (Hübner, 1822)
- Lymantria dispar (Linnaeus, 1758)
- Lymantria monacha (Linnaeus, 1758)
- Metachrostis dardouini (Boisduval, 1840)
- Metachrostis velox (Hübner, 1813)
- Miltochrista miniata (Forster, 1771)
- Minucia lunaris (Denis & Schiffermuller, 1775)
- Nodaria nodosalis (Herrich-Schäffer, 1851)
- Nudaria mundana (Linnaeus, 1761)
- Ocneria ledereri (Milliere, 1869)
- Ocneria rubea (Denis & Schiffermuller, 1775)
- Odice arcuinna (Hübner, 1790)
- Odice suava (Hübner, 1813)
- Ophiusa tirhaca (Cramer, 1773)
- Orectis proboscidata (Herrich-Schäffer, 1851)
- Orgyia recens (Hübner, 1819)
- Orgyia antiqua (Linnaeus, 1758)
- Paracolax tristalis (Fabricius, 1794)
- Parascotia fuliginaria (Linnaeus, 1761)
- Parasemia plantaginis (Linnaeus, 1758)
- Parocneria detrita (Esper, 1785)
- Parocneria terebinthi (Freyer, 1838)
- Pechipogo plumigeralis Hübner, 1825
- Pechipogo strigilata (Linnaeus, 1758)
- Pelosia obtusa (Herrich-Schäffer, 1852)
- Penthophera morio (Linnaeus, 1767)
- Pericallia matronula (Linnaeus, 1758)
- Phragmatobia fuliginosa (Linnaeus, 1758)
- Phragmatobia luctifera (Denis & Schiffermuller, 1775)
- Phytometra viridaria (Clerck, 1759)
- Polypogon gryphalis (Herrich-Schäffer, 1851)
- Polypogon tentacularia (Linnaeus, 1758)
- Rhypagla lacernaria (Hübner, 1813)
- Rhyparia purpurata (Linnaeus, 1758)
- Rivula sericealis (Scopoli, 1763)
- Schrankia costaestrigalis (Stephens, 1834)
- Schrankia taenialis (Hübner, 1809)
- Scoliopteryx libatrix (Linnaeus, 1758)
- Setina irrorella (Linnaeus, 1758)
- Simplicia rectalis (Eversmann, 1842)
- Spilosoma lubricipeda (Linnaeus, 1758)
- Spilosoma lutea (Hufnagel, 1766)
- Spilosoma urticae (Esper, 1789)
- Tathorhynchus exsiccata (Lederer, 1855)
- Trisateles emortualis (Denis & Schiffermuller, 1775)
- Tyria jacobaeae (Linnaeus, 1758)
- Utetheisa pulchella (Linnaeus, 1758)
- Zanclognatha zelleralis (Wocke, 1850)
- Zebeeba falsalis (Herrich-Schäffer, 1839)
- Zekelita antiqualis (Hübner, 1809)
- Zethes insularis Rambur, 1833

=== Euteliidae ===
- Eutelia adoratrix (Staudinger, 1892)
- Eutelia adulatrix (Hübner, 1813)

=== Gelechiidae ===
- Acompsia cinerella (Clerck, 1759)
- Acompsia tripunctella (Denis & Schiffermuller, 1775)
- Altenia elsneriella Huemer & Karsholt, 1999
- Altenia modesta (Danilevsky, 1955)
- Altenia scriptella (Hübner, 1796)
- Altenia wagneriella (Rebel, 1926)
- Anacampsis timidella (Wocke, 1887)
- Anarsia lineatella Zeller, 1839
- Anasphaltis renigerellus (Zeller, 1839)
- Aproaerema anthyllidella (Hübner, 1813)
- Argolamprotes micella (Denis & Schiffermuller, 1775)
- Aristotelia decurtella (Hübner, 1813)
- Aristotelia subericinella (Duponchel, 1843)
- Athrips rancidella (Herrich-Schäffer, 1854)
- Bryotropha hendrikseni Karsholt & Rutten, 2005
- Bryotropha hulli Karsholt & Rutten, 2005
- Bryotropha patockai Elsner & Karsholt, 2003
- Bryotropha plebejella (Zeller, 1847)
- Bryotropha senectella (Zeller, 1839)
- Bryotropha terrella (Denis & Schiffermuller, 1775)
- Carpatolechia decorella (Haworth, 1812)
- Caryocolum blandulella (Tutt, 1887)
- Caryocolum leucomelanella (Zeller, 1839)
- Caryocolum saginella (Zeller, 1868)
- Caryocolum schleichi (Christoph, 1872)
- Caryocolum tischeriella (Zeller, 1839)
- Caulastrocecis pudicellus (Mann, 1861)
- Chionodes holosericella (Herrich-Schäffer, 1854)
- Crossobela trinotella (Herrich-Schäffer, 1856)
- Dactylotula kinkerella (Snellen, 1876)
- Dichomeris alacella (Zeller, 1839)
- Dichomeris derasella (Denis & Schiffermuller, 1775)
- Ephysteris iberica Povolny, 1977
- Eulamprotes baldizzonei Huemer & Karsholt, 2013
- Exoteleia dodecella (Linnaeus, 1758)
- Gelechia dujardini Huemer, 1991
- Gelechia senticetella (Staudinger, 1859)
- Gelechia turpella (Denis & Schiffermuller, 1775)
- Helcystogramma lutatella (Herrich-Schäffer, 1854)
- Istrianis brucinella (Mann, 1872)
- Istrianis femoralis (Staudinger, 1876)
- Iwaruna biguttella (Duponchel, 1843)
- Lutilabria lutilabrella (Mann, 1857)
- Mesophleps oxycedrella (Milliere, 1871)
- Metzneria aestivella (Zeller, 1839)
- Metzneria artificella (Herrich-Schäffer, 1861)
- Metzneria campicolella (Mann, 1857)
- Metzneria diffusella Englert, 1974
- Metzneria intestinella (Mann, 1864)
- Metzneria neuropterella (Zeller, 1839)
- Metzneria tenuiella (Mann, 1864)
- Metzneria torosulella (Rebel, 1893)
- Mirificarma cytisella (Treitschke, 1833)
- Mirificarma eburnella (Denis & Schiffermuller, 1775)
- Mirificarma maculatella (Hübner, 1796)
- Mirificarma mulinella (Zeller, 1839)
- Monochroa nomadella (Zeller, 1868)
- Neotelphusa cisti (Stainton, 1869)
- Nothris lemniscellus (Zeller, 1839)
- Ochrodia subdiminutella (Stainton, 1867)
- Ornativalva heluanensis (Debski, 1913)
- Ornativalva tamaricella (Zeller, 1850)
- Parachronistis albiceps (Zeller, 1839)
- Parastenolechia nigrinotella (Zeller, 1847)
- Pexicopia malvella (Hübner, 1805)
- Phthorimaea operculella (Zeller, 1873)
- Prolita sexpunctella (Fabricius, 1794)
- Psamathocrita dalmatinella Huemer & Tokar, 2000
- Pseudotelphusa istrella (Mann, 1866)
- Pseudotelphusa paripunctella (Thunberg, 1794)
- Pseudotelphusa scalella (Scopoli, 1763)
- Ptocheuusa minimella (Rebel, 1936)
- Ptocheuusa paupella (Zeller, 1847)
- Pyncostola bohemiella (Nickerl, 1864)
- Recurvaria nanella (Denis & Schiffermuller, 1775)
- Scrobipalpa acuminatella (Sircom, 1850)
- Scrobipalpa arenbergeri Povolny, 1973
- Scrobipalpa artemisiella (Treitschke, 1833)
- Scrobipalpa hungariae (Staudinger, 1871)
- Scrobipalpa ocellatella (Boyd, 1858)
- Scrobipalpa portosanctana (Stainton, 1859)
- Scrobipalpa salinella (Zeller, 1847)
- Scrobipalpa samadensis (Pfaffenzeller, 1870)
- Scrobipalpa suaedicola (Mabille, 1906)
- Scrobipalpa tokari Huemer & Karsholt, 2010
- Scrobipalpa voltinella (Chretien, 1898)
- Sitotroga cerealella (Olivier, 1789)
- Sophronia ascalis Gozmany, 1951
- Stenolechiodes pseudogemmellus Elsner, 1996
- Stomopteryx detersella (Zeller, 1847)
- Syncopacma captivella (Herrich-Schäffer, 1854)
- Syncopacma patruella (Mann, 1857)
- Syncopacma polychromella (Rebel, 1902)
- Syncopacma sangiella (Stainton, 1863)
- Teleiopsis terebinthinella (Herrich-Schäffer, 1856)
- Thiotricha majorella (Rebel, 1910)
- Xystophora carchariella (Zeller, 1839)

=== Geometridae ===
- Abraxas grossulariata (Linnaeus, 1758)
- Abraxas pantaria (Linnaeus, 1767)
- Agriopis bajaria (Denis & Schiffermuller, 1775)
- Agriopis leucophaearia (Denis & Schiffermuller, 1775)
- Agriopis marginaria (Fabricius, 1776)
- Alsophila aceraria (Denis & Schiffermuller, 1775)
- Alsophila aescularia (Denis & Schiffermuller, 1775)
- Anticlea derivata (Denis & Schiffermuller, 1775)
- Anticollix sparsata (Treitschke, 1828)
- Aplasta ononaria (Fuessly, 1783)
- Aplocera efformata (Guenee, 1858)
- Aplocera plagiata (Linnaeus, 1758)
- Aplocera praeformata (Hübner, 1826)
- Aplocera simpliciata (Treitschke, 1835)
- Apocheima hispidaria (Denis & Schiffermuller, 1775)
- Ascotis selenaria (Denis & Schiffermuller, 1775)
- Aspitates ochrearia (Rossi, 1794)
- Asthena albulata (Hufnagel, 1767)
- Asthena anseraria (Herrich-Schäffer, 1855)
- Biston betularia (Linnaeus, 1758)
- Biston strataria (Hufnagel, 1767)
- Boudinotiana notha (Hübner, 1803)
- Campaea honoraria (Denis & Schiffermuller, 1775)
- Campaea margaritaria (Linnaeus, 1761)
- Camptogramma bilineata (Linnaeus, 1758)
- Camptogramma scripturata (Hübner, 1799)
- Cataclysme riguata (Hübner, 1813)
- Catarhoe cuculata (Hufnagel, 1767)
- Catarhoe putridaria (Herrich-Schäffer, 1852)
- Catarhoe rubidata (Denis & Schiffermuller, 1775)
- Charissa obscurata (Denis & Schiffermuller, 1775)
- Charissa variegata (Duponchel, 1830)
- Charissa supinaria (Mann, 1854)
- Charissa glaucinaria (Hübner, 1799)
- Chemerina caliginearia (Rambur, 1833)
- Chesias capriata Prout, 1904
- Chesias rufata (Fabricius, 1775)
- Chiasmia aestimaria (Hübner, 1809)
- Chiasmia clathrata (Linnaeus, 1758)
- Chlorissa cloraria (Hübner, 1813)
- Chlorissa viridata (Linnaeus, 1758)
- Chloroclysta siterata (Hufnagel, 1767)
- Chloroclystis v-ata (Haworth, 1809)
- Cidaria fulvata (Forster, 1771)
- Coenotephria ablutaria (Boisduval, 1840)
- Coenotephria tophaceata (Denis & Schiffermuller, 1775)
- Colostygia aqueata (Hübner, 1813)
- Colostygia fitzi (Schawerda, 1914)
- Colostygia olivata (Denis & Schiffermuller, 1775)
- Colostygia pectinataria (Knoch, 1781)
- Colostygia sericeata (Schwingenschuss, 1926)
- Colotois pennaria (Linnaeus, 1761)
- Comibaena bajularia (Denis & Schiffermuller, 1775)
- Cosmorhoe ocellata (Linnaeus, 1758)
- Costaconvexa polygrammata (Borkhausen, 1794)
- Crocallis elinguaria (Linnaeus, 1758)
- Crocallis tusciaria (Borkhausen, 1793)
- Cyclophora linearia (Hübner, 1799)
- Cyclophora porata (Linnaeus, 1767)
- Cyclophora punctaria (Linnaeus, 1758)
- Cyclophora suppunctaria (Zeller, 1847)
- Cyclophora albiocellaria (Hübner, 1789)
- Cyclophora albipunctata (Hufnagel, 1767)
- Cyclophora annularia (Fabricius, 1775)
- Cyclophora puppillaria (Hübner, 1799)
- Cyclophora ruficiliaria (Herrich-Schäffer, 1855)
- Dasycorsa modesta (Staudinger, 1879)
- Dyscia innocentaria (Christoph, 1885)
- Dyscia raunaria (Freyer, 1852)
- Dysstroma citrata (Linnaeus, 1761)
- Dysstroma truncata (Hufnagel, 1767)
- Earophila badiata (Denis & Schiffermuller, 1775)
- Ecliptopera silaceata (Denis & Schiffermuller, 1775)
- Electrophaes corylata (Thunberg, 1792)
- Ematurga atomaria (Linnaeus, 1758)
- Emmiltis pygmaearia (Hübner, 1809)
- Ennomos quercaria (Hübner, 1813)
- Ennomos quercinaria (Hufnagel, 1767)
- Entephria caesiata (Denis & Schiffermuller, 1775)
- Entephria cyanata (Hübner, 1809)
- Epirrhoe alternata (Muller, 1764)
- Epirrhoe galiata (Denis & Schiffermuller, 1775)
- Epirrhoe molluginata (Hübner, 1813)
- Epirrhoe rivata (Hübner, 1813)
- Epirrhoe tristata (Linnaeus, 1758)
- Epirrita autumnata (Borkhausen, 1794)
- Epirrita christyi (Allen, 1906)
- Epirrita dilutata (Denis & Schiffermuller, 1775)
- Erannis defoliaria (Clerck, 1759)
- Euchoeca nebulata (Scopoli, 1763)
- Eucrostes indigenata (de Villers, 1789)
- Eulithis populata (Linnaeus, 1758)
- Eulithis prunata (Linnaeus, 1758)
- Eumera regina Staudinger, 1892
- Euphyia adumbraria (Herrich-Schäffer, 1852)
- Euphyia biangulata (Haworth, 1809)
- Euphyia mesembrina (Rebel, 1927)
- Eupithecia abbreviata Stephens, 1831
- Eupithecia abietaria (Goeze, 1781)
- Eupithecia absinthiata (Clerck, 1759)
- Eupithecia assimilata Doubleday, 1856
- Eupithecia breviculata (Donzel, 1837)
- Eupithecia centaureata (Denis & Schiffermuller, 1775)
- Eupithecia cocciferata Milliere, 1864
- Eupithecia cuculliaria (Rebel, 1901)
- Eupithecia distinctaria Herrich-Schäffer, 1848
- Eupithecia dodoneata Guenee, 1858
- Eupithecia druentiata Dietze, 1902
- Eupithecia ericeata (Rambur, 1833)
- Eupithecia expallidata Doubleday, 1856
- Eupithecia gemellata Herrich-Schäffer, 1861
- Eupithecia graphata (Treitschke, 1828)
- Eupithecia gratiosata Herrich-Schäffer, 1861
- Eupithecia haworthiata Doubleday, 1856
- Eupithecia icterata (de Villers, 1789)
- Eupithecia innotata (Hufnagel, 1767)
- Eupithecia insigniata (Hübner, 1790)
- Eupithecia irriguata (Hübner, 1813)
- Eupithecia laquaearia Herrich-Schäffer, 1848
- Eupithecia linariata (Denis & Schiffermuller, 1775)
- Eupithecia pauxillaria Boisduval, 1840
- Eupithecia phoeniceata (Rambur, 1834)
- Eupithecia pimpinellata (Hübner, 1813)
- Eupithecia plumbeolata (Haworth, 1809)
- Eupithecia pusillata (Denis & Schiffermuller, 1775)
- Eupithecia riparia Herrich-Schäffer, 1851
- Eupithecia scopariata (Rambur, 1833)
- Eupithecia selinata Herrich-Schäffer, 1861
- Eupithecia semigraphata Bruand, 1850
- Eupithecia subfuscata (Haworth, 1809)
- Eupithecia tantillaria Boisduval, 1840
- Eupithecia tenuiata (Hübner, 1813)
- Eupithecia tripunctaria Herrich-Schäffer, 1852
- Eupithecia unedonata Mabille, 1868
- Eupithecia variostrigata Alphéraky, 1876
- Eupithecia venosata (Fabricius, 1787)
- Eupithecia vulgata (Haworth, 1809)
- Gandaritis pyraliata (Denis & Schiffermuller, 1775)
- Geometra papilionaria (Linnaeus, 1758)
- Gnopharmia stevenaria (Boisduval, 1840)
- Gnophos sartata Treitschke, 1827
- Gnophos dumetata Treitschke, 1827
- Gymnoscelis rufifasciata (Haworth, 1809)
- Heliomata glarearia (Denis & Schiffermuller, 1775)
- Hemistola chrysoprasaria (Esper, 1795)
- Hemithea aestivaria (Hübner, 1789)
- Horisme calligraphata (Herrich-Schäffer, 1838)
- Horisme corticata (Treitschke, 1835)
- Horisme radicaria (de La Harpe, 1855)
- Horisme tersata (Denis & Schiffermuller, 1775)
- Horisme vitalbata (Denis & Schiffermuller, 1775)
- Hydrelia flammeolaria (Hufnagel, 1767)
- Hydrelia sylvata (Denis & Schiffermuller, 1775)
- Hydria cervinalis (Scopoli, 1763)
- Hydriomena furcata (Thunberg, 1784)
- Hydriomena impluviata (Denis & Schiffermuller, 1775)
- Hypomecis punctinalis (Scopoli, 1763)
- Idaea albitorquata (Pungeler, 1909)
- Idaea aureolaria (Denis & Schiffermuller, 1775)
- Idaea aversata (Linnaeus, 1758)
- Idaea camparia (Herrich-Schäffer, 1852)
- Idaea circuitaria (Hübner, 1819)
- Idaea consanguinaria (Lederer, 1853)
- Idaea consolidata (Lederer, 1853)
- Idaea contiguaria (Hübner, 1799)
- Idaea degeneraria (Hübner, 1799)
- Idaea deversaria (Herrich-Schäffer, 1847)
- Idaea dilutaria (Hübner, 1799)
- Idaea dimidiata (Hufnagel, 1767)
- Idaea distinctaria (Boisduval, 1840)
- Idaea elongaria (Rambur, 1833)
- Idaea filicata (Hübner, 1799)
- Idaea infirmaria (Rambur, 1833)
- Idaea inquinata (Scopoli, 1763)
- Idaea laevigata (Scopoli, 1763)
- Idaea leipnitzi Hausmann, 2004
- Idaea metohiensis (Rebel, 1900)
- Idaea moniliata (Denis & Schiffermuller, 1775)
- Idaea muricata (Hufnagel, 1767)
- Idaea nitidata (Herrich-Schäffer, 1861)
- Idaea obsoletaria (Rambur, 1833)
- Idaea ochrata (Scopoli, 1763)
- Idaea ostrinaria (Hübner, 1813)
- Idaea politaria (Hübner, 1799)
- Idaea rubraria (Staudinger, 1901)
- Idaea rufaria (Hübner, 1799)
- Idaea rusticata (Denis & Schiffermuller, 1775)
- Idaea seriata (Schrank, 1802)
- Idaea sericeata (Hübner, 1813)
- Idaea serpentata (Hufnagel, 1767)
- Idaea subsericeata (Haworth, 1809)
- Idaea trigeminata (Haworth, 1809)
- Jodis lactearia (Linnaeus, 1758)
- Larentia malvata (Rambur, 1833)
- Ligdia adustata (Denis & Schiffermuller, 1775)
- Lomographa temerata (Denis & Schiffermuller, 1775)
- Lycia graecarius (Staudinger, 1861)
- Lycia hirtaria (Clerck, 1759)
- Lythria purpuraria (Linnaeus, 1758)
- Melanthia procellata (Denis & Schiffermuller, 1775)
- Menophra abruptaria (Thunberg, 1792)
- Mesoleuca albicillata (Linnaeus, 1758)
- Mesotype parallelolineata (Retzius, 1783)
- Microloxia herbaria (Hübner, 1813)
- Minoa murinata (Scopoli, 1763)
- Mirlatia arcuata (Hausmann, László, Mayr, Huemer, 2023)
- Nebula achromaria (de La Harpe, 1853)
- Nebula nebulata (Treitschke, 1828)
- Nebula senectaria (Herrich-Schäffer, 1852)
- Nychiodes dalmatina Wagner, 1909
- Nycterosea obstipata (Fabricius, 1794)
- Odezia atrata (Linnaeus, 1758)
- Operophtera brumata (Linnaeus, 1758)
- Operophtera fagata (Scharfenberg, 1805)
- Opisthograptis luteolata (Linnaeus, 1758)
- Orthonama vittata (Borkhausen, 1794)
- Orthostixis cribraria (Hübner, 1799)
- Pachycnemia hippocastanaria (Hübner, 1799)
- Pachycnemia tibiaria (Rambur, 1829)
- Pareulype berberata (Denis & Schiffermuller, 1775)
- Pasiphila chloerata (Mabille, 1870)
- Pasiphila debiliata (Hübner, 1817)
- Pasiphila rectangulata (Linnaeus, 1758)
- Pennithera ulicata (Rambur, 1934)
- Peribatodes correptaria (Zeller, 1847)
- Peribatodes rhomboidaria (Denis & Schiffermuller, 1775)
- Peribatodes secundaria (Denis & Schiffermuller, 1775)
- Peribatodes umbraria (Hübner, 1809)
- Perizoma albulata (Denis & Schiffermuller, 1775)
- Perizoma alchemillata (Linnaeus, 1758)
- Perizoma bifaciata (Haworth, 1809)
- Perizoma blandiata (Denis & Schiffermuller, 1775)
- Perizoma flavofasciata (Thunberg, 1792)
- Perizoma flavosparsata (Wagner, 1926)
- Perizoma lugdunaria (Herrich-Schäffer, 1855)
- Perizoma minorata (Treitschke, 1828)
- Petrophora chlorosata (Scopoli, 1763)
- Phaiogramma etruscaria (Zeller, 1849)
- Phibalapteryx virgata (Hufnagel, 1767)
- Philereme transversata (Hufnagel, 1767)
- Philereme vetulata (Denis & Schiffermuller, 1775)
- Plemyria rubiginata (Denis & Schiffermuller, 1775)
- Pseudobaptria bogumilaria (Rebel, 1904)
- Pseudopanthera macularia (Linnaeus, 1758)
- Pseudoterpna pruinata (Hufnagel, 1767)
- Pterapherapteryx sexalata (Retzius, 1783)
- Rhodometra sacraria (Linnaeus, 1767)
- Rhodostrophia calabra (Petagna, 1786)
- Rhodostrophia vibicaria (Clerck, 1759)
- Rhoptria asperaria (Hübner, 1817)
- Schistostege decussata (Denis & Schiffermuller, 1775)
- Scopula beckeraria (Lederer, 1853)
- Scopula confinaria (Herrich-Schäffer, 1847)
- Scopula emutaria (Hübner, 1809)
- Scopula flaccidaria (Zeller, 1852)
- Scopula imitaria (Hübner, 1799)
- Scopula immutata (Linnaeus, 1758)
- Scopula incanata (Linnaeus, 1758)
- Scopula marginepunctata (Goeze, 1781)
- Scopula caricaria (Reutti, 1853)
- Scopula decorata (Denis & Schiffermuller, 1775)
- Scopula immorata (Linnaeus, 1758)
- Scopula nigropunctata (Hufnagel, 1767)
- Scopula ornata (Scopoli, 1763)
- Scopula rubiginata (Hufnagel, 1767)
- Scopula submutata (Treitschke, 1828)
- Scopula tessellaria (Boisduval, 1840)
- Scopula virgulata (Denis & Schiffermuller, 1775)
- Scotopteryx bipunctaria (Denis & Schiffermuller, 1775)
- Scotopteryx chenopodiata (Linnaeus, 1758)
- Scotopteryx coarctaria (Denis & Schiffermuller, 1775)
- Scotopteryx luridata (Hufnagel, 1767)
- Scotopteryx moeniata (Scopoli, 1763)
- Scotopteryx mucronata (Scopoli, 1763)
- Scotopteryx vicinaria (Duponchel, 1830)
- Selenia lunularia (Hübner, 1788)
- Selidosema plumaria (Denis & Schiffermuller, 1775)
- Siona lineata (Scopoli, 1763)
- Stegania dalmataria Guenee, 1858
- Stegania trimaculata (de Villers, 1789)
- Synopsia sociaria (Hübner, 1799)
- Tephronia sepiaria (Hufnagel, 1767)
- Thalera fimbrialis (Scopoli, 1763)
- Thera britannica (Turner, 1925)
- Thera cupressata (Geyer, 1831)
- Thera juniperata (Linnaeus, 1758)
- Thera variata (Denis & Schiffermuller, 1775)
- Thetidia smaragdaria (Fabricius, 1787)
- Timandra comae Schmidt, 1931
- Triphosa dubitata (Linnaeus, 1758)
- Triphosa sabaudiata (Duponchel, 1830)
- Venusia cambrica Curtis, 1839
- Xanthorhoe biriviata (Borkhausen, 1794)
- Xanthorhoe designata (Hufnagel, 1767)
- Xanthorhoe ferrugata (Clerck, 1759)
- Xanthorhoe fluctuata (Linnaeus, 1758)
- Xanthorhoe incursata (Hübner, 1813)
- Xanthorhoe montanata (Denis & Schiffermuller, 1775)
- Xanthorhoe oxybiata (Milliere, 1872)
- Xanthorhoe quadrifasiata (Clerck, 1759)
- Xanthorhoe spadicearia (Denis & Schiffermuller, 1775)
- Xenochlorodes olympiaria (Herrich-Schäffer, 1852)

=== Glyphipterigidae ===
- Acrolepia autumnitella Curtis, 1838
- Acrolepiopsis marcidella (Curtis, 1850)
- Acrolepiopsis vesperella (Zeller, 1850)
- Digitivalva heringi (Klimesch, 1956)
- Digitivalva perlepidella (Stainton, 1849)
- Digitivalva reticulella (Hübner, 1796)
- Digitivalva occidentella (Klimesch, 1956)
- Digitivalva orientella (Klimesch, 1956)
- Digitivalva pulicariae (Klimesch, 1956)
- Digitivalva wolfschlaegeri (Klimesch, 1956)

=== Gracillariidae ===
- Acrocercops brongniardella (Fabricius, 1798)
- Aspilapteryx limosella (Duponchel, 1843)
- Aspilapteryx tringipennella (Zeller, 1839)
- Caloptilia elongella (Linnaeus, 1761)
- Caloptilia falconipennella (Hübner, 1813)
- Caloptilia fidella (Reutti, 1853)
- Caloptilia fribergensis (Fritzsche, 1871)
- Caloptilia nobilella (Klimesch, 1942)
- Caloptilia stigmatella (Fabricius, 1781)
- Cameraria ohridella Deschka & Dimic, 1986
- Cupedia cupediella (Herrich-Schäffer, 1855)
- Dialectica scalariella (Zeller, 1850)
- Euspilapteryx auroguttella Stephens, 1835
- Micrurapteryx kollariella (Zeller, 1839)
- Parectopa robiniella Clemens, 1863
- Parornix ampliatella (Stainton, 1850)
- Parornix anguliferella (Zeller, 1847)
- Parornix carpinella (Frey, 1863)
- Parornix devoniella (Stainton, 1850)
- Parornix fagivora (Frey, 1861)
- Parornix scoticella (Stainton, 1850)
- Phyllocnistis saligna (Zeller, 1839)
- Phyllonorycter abrasella (Duponchel, 1843)
- Phyllonorycter amseli (Povolny & Gregor, 1955)
- Phyllonorycter belotella (Staudinger, 1859)
- Phyllonorycter cephalariae (Lhomme, 1934)
- Phyllonorycter coryli (Nicelli, 1851)
- Phyllonorycter corylifoliella (Hübner, 1796)
- Phyllonorycter esperella (Goeze, 1783)
- Phyllonorycter eugregori A. & Z. Lastuvka, 2006
- Phyllonorycter fiumella (Krone, 1910)
- Phyllonorycter geniculella (Ragonot, 1874)
- Phyllonorycter helianthemella (Herrich-Schäffer, 1861)
- Phyllonorycter klemannella (Fabricius, 1781)
- Phyllonorycter kusdasi Deschka, 1970
- Phyllonorycter lantanella (Schrank, 1802)
- Phyllonorycter lapadiella (Krone, 1909)
- Phyllonorycter leucographella (Zeller, 1850)
- Phyllonorycter maestingella (Muller, 1764)
- Phyllonorycter mannii (Zeller, 1846)
- Phyllonorycter messaniella (Zeller, 1846)
- Phyllonorycter millierella (Staudinger, 1871)
- Phyllonorycter oxyacanthae (Frey, 1856)
- Phyllonorycter robiniella (Clemens, 1859)
- Phyllonorycter suberifoliella (Zeller, 1850)
- Phyllonorycter sublautella (Stainton, 1869)
- Phyllonorycter triflorella (Peyerimhoff, 1872)

=== Heliozelidae ===
- Antispila metallella (Denis & Schiffermuller, 1775)
- Heliozela sericiella (Haworth, 1828)

=== Hepialidae ===
- Pharmacis lupulina (Linnaeus, 1758)
- Triodia adriaticus (Osthelder, 1931)
- Triodia sylvina (Linnaeus, 1761)

=== Heterogynidae ===
- Heterogynis penella (Hübner, 1819)

=== Incurvariidae ===
- Incurvaria masculella (Denis & Schiffermuller, 1775)
- Incurvaria oehlmanniella (Hübner, 1796)
- Incurvaria pectinea Haworth, 1828

=== Lasiocampidae ===
- Cosmotriche lobulina (Denis & Schiffermuller, 1775)
- Dendrolimus pini (Linnaeus, 1758)
- Eriogaster catax (Linnaeus, 1758)
- Eriogaster lanestris (Linnaeus, 1758)
- Eriogaster rimicola (Denis & Schiffermuller, 1775)
- Gastropacha quercifolia (Linnaeus, 1758)
- Gastropacha populifolia (Denis & Schiffermuller, 1775)
- Lasiocampa quercus (Linnaeus, 1758)
- Lasiocampa trifolii (Denis & Schiffermuller, 1775)
- Macrothylacia rubi (Linnaeus, 1758)
- Malacosoma castrensis (Linnaeus, 1758)
- Malacosoma neustria (Linnaeus, 1758)
- Odonestis pruni (Linnaeus, 1758)
- Phyllodesma tremulifolia (Hübner, 1810)
- Poecilocampa alpina (Frey & Wullschlegel, 1874)
- Poecilocampa populi (Linnaeus, 1758)
- Trichiura crataegi (Linnaeus, 1758)

=== Lecithoceridae ===
- Lecithocera nigrana (Duponchel, 1836)
- Odites kollarella (O. G. Costa, 1832)

=== Limacodidae ===
- Apoda limacodes (Hufnagel, 1766)
- Heterogenea asella (Denis & Schiffermuller, 1775)

=== Lyonetiidae ===
- Leucoptera aceris (Fuchs, 1903)
- Leucoptera heringiella Toll, 1938
- Leucoptera laburnella (Stainton, 1851)
- Leucoptera lotella (Stainton, 1859)
- Leucoptera malifoliella (O. Costa, 1836)
- Lyonetia clerkella (Linnaeus, 1758)
- Lyonetia prunifoliella (Hübner, 1796)

=== Lypusidae ===
- Pseudatemelia aeneella Rebel, 1910
- Pseudatemelia chalcocrates (Meyrick, 1930)
- Pseudatemelia flavifrontella (Denis & Schiffermuller, 1775)

=== Micropterigidae ===
- Micropterix allionella (Fabricius, 1794)
- Micropterix amsella Heath, 1975
- Micropterix aruncella (Scopoli, 1763)
- Micropterix croatica Heath & Kaltenbach, 1984
- Micropterix facetella Zeller, 1850
- Micropterix myrtetella Zeller, 1850
- Micropterix rothenbachii Frey, 1856

=== Millieridae ===
- Millieria dolosalis (Heydenreich, 1851)

=== Momphidae ===
- Mompha langiella (Hübner, 1796)
- Mompha miscella (Denis & Schiffermuller, 1775)
- Mompha divisella Herrich-Schäffer, 1854
- Mompha epilobiella (Denis & Schiffermuller, 1775)
- Mompha subbistrigella (Haworth, 1828)

=== Nepticulidae ===
- Acalyptris limonii Z. & A. Lastuvka, 1998
- Acalyptris maritima A. & Z. Lastuvka, 1997
- Acalyptris minimella (Rebel, 1924)
- Acalyptris platani (Muller-Rutz, 1934)
- Bohemannia pulverosella (Stainton, 1849)
- Ectoedemia agrimoniae (Frey, 1858)
- Ectoedemia albifasciella (Heinemann, 1871)
- Ectoedemia angulifasciella (Stainton, 1849)
- Ectoedemia arcuatella (Herrich-Schäffer, 1855)
- Ectoedemia argyropeza (Zeller, 1839)
- Ectoedemia atricollis (Stainton, 1857)
- Ectoedemia caradjai (Groschke, 1944)
- Ectoedemia cerris (Zimmermann, 1944)
- Ectoedemia erythrogenella (de Joannis, 1908)
- Ectoedemia gilvipennella (Klimesch, 1946)
- Ectoedemia hannoverella (Glitz, 1872)
- Ectoedemia haraldi (Soffner, 1942)
- Ectoedemia heringella (Mariani, 1939)
- Ectoedemia heringi (Toll, 1934)
- Ectoedemia intimella (Zeller, 1848)
- Ectoedemia klimeschi (Skala, 1933)
- Ectoedemia liechtensteini (Zimmermann, 1944)
- Ectoedemia mahalebella (Klimesch, 1936)
- Ectoedemia occultella (Linnaeus, 1767)
- Ectoedemia quinquella (Bedell, 1848)
- Ectoedemia rubivora (Wocke, 1860)
- Ectoedemia spinosella (de Joannis, 1908)
- Ectoedemia subbimaculella (Haworth, 1828)
- Ectoedemia turbidella (Zeller, 1848)
- Ectoedemia decentella (Herrich-Schäffer, 1855)
- Ectoedemia louisella (Sircom, 1849)
- Ectoedemia obtusa (Puplesis & Diskus, 1996)
- Ectoedemia sericopeza (Zeller, 1839)
- Ectoedemia groschkei (Skala, 1943)
- Ectoedemia septembrella (Stainton, 1849)
- Ectoedemia amani Svensson, 1966
- Ectoedemia longicaudella Klimesch, 1953
- Ectoedemia reichli Z. & A. Lastuvka, 1998
- Parafomoria helianthemella (Herrich-Schäffer, 1860)
- Parafomoria pseudocistivora van Nieukerken, 1983
- Simplimorpha promissa (Staudinger, 1871)
- Stigmella aceris (Frey, 1857)
- Stigmella aeneofasciella (Herrich-Schäffer, 1855)
- Stigmella alnetella (Stainton, 1856)
- Stigmella anomalella (Goeze, 1783)
- Stigmella assimilella (Zeller, 1848)
- Stigmella atricapitella (Haworth, 1828)
- Stigmella aurella (Fabricius, 1775)
- Stigmella auromarginella (Richardson, 1890)
- Stigmella basiguttella (Heinemann, 1862)
- Stigmella betulicola (Stainton, 1856)
- Stigmella carpinella (Heinemann, 1862)
- Stigmella catharticella (Stainton, 1853)
- Stigmella centifoliella (Zeller, 1848)
- Stigmella crataegella (Klimesch, 1936)
- Stigmella desperatella (Frey, 1856)
- Stigmella dorsiguttella (Johansson, 1971)
- Stigmella eberhardi (Johansson, 1971)
- Stigmella fasciata van Nieukerken & Johansson, 2003
- Stigmella floslactella (Haworth, 1828)
- Stigmella freyella (Heyden, 1858)
- Stigmella glutinosae (Stainton, 1858)
- Stigmella hahniella (Worz, 1937)
- Stigmella hemargyrella (Kollar, 1832)
- Stigmella hybnerella (Hübner, 1796)
- Stigmella incognitella (Herrich-Schäffer, 1855)
- Stigmella johanssonella A. & Z. Lastuvka, 1997
- Stigmella lapponica (Wocke, 1862)
- Stigmella lemniscella (Zeller, 1839)
- Stigmella luteella (Stainton, 1857)
- Stigmella malella (Stainton, 1854)
- Stigmella mespilicola (Frey, 1856)
- Stigmella microtheriella (Stainton, 1854)
- Stigmella minusculella (Herrich-Schäffer, 1855)
- Stigmella nivenburgensis (Preissecker, 1942)
- Stigmella nylandriella (Tengstrom, 1848)
- Stigmella obliquella (Heinemann, 1862)
- Stigmella oxyacanthella (Stainton, 1854)
- Stigmella paliurella Gerasimov, 1937
- Stigmella paradoxa (Frey, 1858)
- Stigmella perpygmaeella (Doubleday, 1859)
- Stigmella plagicolella (Stainton, 1854)
- Stigmella prunetorum (Stainton, 1855)
- Stigmella pyri (Glitz, 1865)
- Stigmella regiella (Herrich-Schäffer, 1855)
- Stigmella rhamnella (Herrich-Schäffer, 1860)
- Stigmella roborella (Johansson, 1971)
- Stigmella rolandi van Nieukerken, 1990
- Stigmella salicis (Stainton, 1854)
- Stigmella samiatella (Zeller, 1839)
- Stigmella speciosa (Frey, 1858)
- Stigmella splendidissimella (Herrich-Schäffer, 1855)
- Stigmella suberivora (Stainton, 1869)
- Stigmella thuringiaca (Petry, 1904)
- Stigmella tiliae (Frey, 1856)
- Stigmella trimaculella (Haworth, 1828)
- Stigmella ulmivora (Fologne, 1860)
- Stigmella viscerella (Stainton, 1853)
- Stigmella zangherii (Klimesch, 1951)
- Trifurcula bleonella (Chretien, 1904)
- Trifurcula headleyella (Stainton, 1854)
- Trifurcula istriae A. & Z. Lastuvka, 2000
- Trifurcula melanoptera van Nieukerken & Puplesis, 1991
- Trifurcula saturejae (Parenti, 1963)
- Trifurcula cryptella (Stainton, 1856)
- Trifurcula eurema (Tutt, 1899)
- Trifurcula manygoza van Nieukerken, A. & Z. Lastuvka, 2007
- Trifurcula ortneri (Klimesch, 1951)
- Trifurcula aurella Rebel, 1933
- Trifurcula calycotomella A. & Z. Lastuvka, 1997
- Trifurcula josefklimeschi van Nieukerken, 1990
- Trifurcula orientella Klimesch, 1953
- Trifurcula pallidella (Duponchel, 1843)

=== Noctuidae ===
- Abrostola agnorista Dufay, 1956
- Abrostola asclepiadis (Denis & Schiffermuller, 1775)
- Abrostola tripartita (Hufnagel, 1766)
- Abrostola triplasia (Linnaeus, 1758)
- Acontia lucida (Hufnagel, 1766)
- Acontia trabealis (Scopoli, 1763)
- Acontia melanura (Tauscher, 1809)
- Acontiola moldavicola (Herrich-Schäffer, 1851)
- Acosmetia caliginosa (Hübner, 1813)
- Acronicta aceris (Linnaeus, 1758)
- Acronicta leporina (Linnaeus, 1758)
- Acronicta strigosa (Denis & Schiffermuller, 1775)
- Acronicta alni (Linnaeus, 1767)
- Acronicta cuspis (Hübner, 1813)
- Acronicta psi (Linnaeus, 1758)
- Acronicta tridens (Denis & Schiffermuller, 1775)
- Acronicta auricoma (Denis & Schiffermuller, 1775)
- Acronicta euphorbiae (Denis & Schiffermuller, 1775)
- Acronicta orientalis (Mann, 1862)
- Acronicta rumicis (Linnaeus, 1758)
- Actebia praecox (Linnaeus, 1758)
- Actebia fugax (Treitschke, 1825)
- Actinotia polyodon (Clerck, 1759)
- Actinotia radiosa (Esper, 1804)
- Aedia funesta (Esper, 1786)
- Aedia leucomelas (Linnaeus, 1758)
- Aegle kaekeritziana (Hübner, 1799)
- Aegle semicana (Esper, 1798)
- Agrochola lychnidis (Denis & Schiffermuller, 1775)
- Agrochola lactiflora Draudt, 1934
- Agrochola helvola (Linnaeus, 1758)
- Agrochola humilis (Denis & Schiffermuller, 1775)
- Agrochola kindermannii (Fischer v. Röslerstamm, 1837)
- Agrochola litura (Linnaeus, 1758)
- Agrochola nitida (Denis & Schiffermuller, 1775)
- Agrochola thurneri Boursin, 1953
- Agrochola lota (Clerck, 1759)
- Agrochola macilenta (Hübner, 1809)
- Agrochola laevis (Hübner, 1803)
- Agrotis bigramma (Esper, 1790)
- Agrotis cinerea (Denis & Schiffermuller, 1775)
- Agrotis clavis (Hufnagel, 1766)
- Agrotis exclamationis (Linnaeus, 1758)
- Agrotis ipsilon (Hufnagel, 1766)
- Agrotis puta (Hübner, 1803)
- Agrotis segetum (Denis & Schiffermuller, 1775)
- Agrotis spinifera (Hübner, 1808)
- Agrotis trux (Hübner, 1824)
- Allophyes oxyacanthae (Linnaeus, 1758)
- Amephana dalmatica (Rebel, 1919)
- Ammoconia caecimacula (Denis & Schiffermuller, 1775)
- Ammoconia senex (Geyer, 1828)
- Amphipoea fucosa (Freyer, 1830)
- Amphipoea oculea (Linnaeus, 1761)
- Amphipyra berbera Rungs, 1949
- Amphipyra effusa Boisduval, 1828
- Amphipyra livida (Denis & Schiffermuller, 1775)
- Amphipyra micans Lederer, 1857
- Amphipyra perflua (Fabricius, 1787)
- Amphipyra pyramidea (Linnaeus, 1758)
- Amphipyra stix Herrich-Schäffer, 1850
- Amphipyra tetra (Fabricius, 1787)
- Amphipyra tragopoginis (Clerck, 1759)
- Amphipyra cinnamomea (Goeze, 1781)
- Anaplectoides prasina (Denis & Schiffermuller, 1775)
- Anarta myrtilli (Linnaeus, 1761)
- Anarta dianthi (Tauscher, 1809)
- Anarta odontites (Boisduval, 1829)
- Anarta trifolii (Hufnagel, 1766)
- Anorthoa munda (Denis & Schiffermuller, 1775)
- Anthracia eriopoda (Herrich-Schäffer, 1851)
- Antitype chi (Linnaeus, 1758)
- Antitype jonis (Lederer, 1865)
- Antitype suda (Geyer, 1832)
- Apamea anceps (Denis & Schiffermuller, 1775)
- Apamea aquila Donzel, 1837
- Apamea crenata (Hufnagel, 1766)
- Apamea epomidion (Haworth, 1809)
- Apamea furva (Denis & Schiffermuller, 1775)
- Apamea illyria Freyer, 1846
- Apamea lateritia (Hufnagel, 1766)
- Apamea lithoxylaea (Denis & Schiffermuller, 1775)
- Apamea maillardi (Geyer, 1834)
- Apamea monoglypha (Hufnagel, 1766)
- Apamea oblonga (Haworth, 1809)
- Apamea platinea (Treitschke, 1825)
- Apamea remissa (Hübner, 1809)
- Apamea rubrirena (Treitschke, 1825)
- Apamea scolopacina (Esper, 1788)
- Apamea sordens (Hufnagel, 1766)
- Apamea sublustris (Esper, 1788)
- Apamea syriaca (Osthelder, 1933)
- Apamea unanimis (Hübner, 1813)
- Apamea zeta (Treitschke, 1825)
- Apaustis rupicola (Denis & Schiffermuller, 1775)
- Aporophyla australis (Boisduval, 1829)
- Aporophyla canescens (Duponchel, 1826)
- Aporophyla lutulenta (Denis & Schiffermuller, 1775)
- Aporophyla nigra (Haworth, 1809)
- Apterogenum ypsillon (Denis & Schiffermuller, 1775)
- Archanara neurica (Hübner, 1808)
- Asteroscopus sphinx (Hufnagel, 1766)
- Asteroscopus syriaca (Warren, 1910)
- Atethmia ambusta (Denis & Schiffermuller, 1775)
- Atethmia centrago (Haworth, 1809)
- Athetis furvula (Hübner, 1808)
- Athetis gluteosa (Treitschke, 1835)
- Athetis pallustris (Hübner, 1808)
- Athetis lepigone (Moschler, 1860)
- Atypha pulmonaris (Esper, 1790)
- Auchmis detersa (Esper, 1787)
- Autographa gamma (Linnaeus, 1758)
- Autographa jota (Linnaeus, 1758)
- Autographa pulchrina (Haworth, 1809)
- Axylia putris (Linnaeus, 1761)
- Behounekia freyeri (Frivaldszky, 1835)
- Brachionycha nubeculosa (Esper, 1785)
- Brachylomia viminalis (Fabricius, 1776)
- Bryophila ereptricula Treitschke, 1825
- Bryophila felina (Eversmann, 1852)
- Bryophila orthogramma (Boursin, 1954)
- Bryophila raptricula (Denis & Schiffermuller, 1775)
- Bryophila ravula (Hübner, 1813)
- Bryophila rectilinea (Warren, 1909)
- Bryophila seladona Christoph, 1885
- Bryophila tephrocharis (Boursin, 1953)
- Bryophila domestica (Hufnagel, 1766)
- Calamia tridens (Hufnagel, 1766)
- Calliergis ramosa (Esper, 1786)
- Callopistria juventina (Stoll, 1782)
- Callopistria latreillei (Duponchel, 1827)
- Calophasia lunula (Hufnagel, 1766)
- Calophasia opalina (Esper, 1793)
- Calophasia platyptera (Esper, 1788)
- Caradrina morpheus (Hufnagel, 1766)
- Caradrina gilva (Donzel, 1837)
- Caradrina clavipalpis Scopoli, 1763
- Caradrina flavirena Guenee, 1852
- Caradrina selini Boisduval, 1840
- Caradrina suscianja (Mentzer, 1981)
- Caradrina wullschlegeli Pungeler, 1903
- Caradrina aspersa Rambur, 1834
- Caradrina kadenii Freyer, 1836
- Caradrina terrea Freyer, 1840
- Ceramica pisi (Linnaeus, 1758)
- Cerapteryx graminis (Linnaeus, 1758)
- Cerastis rubricosa (Denis & Schiffermuller, 1775)
- Charanyca trigrammica (Hufnagel, 1766)
- Charanyca apfelbecki (Rebel, 1901)
- Charanyca ferruginea (Esper, 1785)
- Chersotis cuprea (Denis & Schiffermuller, 1775)
- Chersotis fimbriola (Esper, 1803)
- Chersotis laeta (Rebel, 1904)
- Chersotis margaritacea (Villers, 1789)
- Chersotis multangula (Hübner, 1803)
- Chilodes maritima (Tauscher, 1806)
- Chloantha hyperici (Denis & Schiffermuller, 1775)
- Chrysodeixis chalcites (Esper, 1789)
- Cleoceris scoriacea (Esper, 1789)
- Cleonymia opposita (Lederer, 1870)
- Colocasia coryli (Linnaeus, 1758)
- Condica viscosa (Freyer, 1831)
- Conisania leineri (Freyer, 1836)
- Conisania luteago (Denis & Schiffermuller, 1775)
- Conistra ligula (Esper, 1791)
- Conistra rubiginosa (Scopoli, 1763)
- Conistra vaccinii (Linnaeus, 1761)
- Conistra veronicae (Hübner, 1813)
- Conistra erythrocephala (Denis & Schiffermuller, 1775)
- Conistra rubiginea (Denis & Schiffermuller, 1775)
- Conistra ragusae (Failla-Tedaldi, 1890)
- Conistra torrida (Lederer, 1857)
- Coranarta cordigera (Thunberg, 1788)
- Cosmia trapezina (Linnaeus, 1758)
- Cosmia pyralina (Denis & Schiffermuller, 1775)
- Cosmia confinis Herrich-Schäffer, 1849
- Cosmia affinis (Linnaeus, 1767)
- Craniophora ligustri (Denis & Schiffermuller, 1775)
- Craniophora pontica (Staudinger, 1878)
- Cryphia fraudatricula (Hübner, 1803)
- Cryphia receptricula (Hübner, 1803)
- Cryphia algae (Fabricius, 1775)
- Cryphia ochsi (Boursin, 1940)
- Crypsedra gemmea (Treitschke, 1825)
- Cucullia celsiae Herrich-Schäffer, 1850
- Cucullia absinthii (Linnaeus, 1761)
- Cucullia argentea (Hufnagel, 1766)
- Cucullia artemisiae (Hufnagel, 1766)
- Cucullia asteris (Denis & Schiffermuller, 1775)
- Cucullia balsamitae Boisduval, 1840
- Cucullia campanulae Freyer, 1831
- Cucullia chamomillae (Denis & Schiffermuller, 1775)
- Cucullia formosa Rogenhofer, 1860
- Cucullia fraudatrix Eversmann, 1837
- Cucullia lactucae (Denis & Schiffermuller, 1775)
- Cucullia lucifuga (Denis & Schiffermuller, 1775)
- Cucullia santonici (Hübner, 1813)
- Cucullia scopariae Dorfmeister, 1853
- Cucullia tanaceti (Denis & Schiffermuller, 1775)
- Cucullia umbratica (Linnaeus, 1758)
- Cucullia xeranthemi Boisduval, 1840
- Cucullia blattariae (Esper, 1790)
- Cucullia lanceolata (Villers, 1789)
- Cucullia lychnitis Rambur, 1833
- Cucullia prenanthis Boisduval, 1840
- Cucullia scrophulariae (Denis & Schiffermuller, 1775)
- Cucullia verbasci (Linnaeus, 1758)
- Dasypolia ferdinandi Ruhl, 1892
- Deltote bankiana (Fabricius, 1775)
- Deltote deceptoria (Scopoli, 1763)
- Deltote uncula (Clerck, 1759)
- Deltote pygarga (Hufnagel, 1766)
- Denticucullus pygmina (Haworth, 1809)
- Diachrysia chrysitis (Linnaeus, 1758)
- Diachrysia chryson (Esper, 1789)
- Diachrysia nadeja (Oberthur, 1880)
- Diachrysia zosimi (Hübner, 1822)
- Diarsia mendica (Fabricius, 1775)
- Diarsia rubi (Vieweg, 1790)
- Dichagyris melanura (Kollar, 1846)
- Dichagyris nigrescens (Hofner, 1888)
- Dichagyris orientis (Alphéraky, 1882)
- Dichonia aeruginea (Hübner, 1808)
- Dichonia convergens (Denis & Schiffermuller, 1775)
- Dicycla oo (Linnaeus, 1758)
- Diloba caeruleocephala (Linnaeus, 1758)
- Dioszeghyana schmidti (Dioszeghy, 1935)
- Divaena haywardi (Tams, 1926)
- Dryobota labecula (Esper, 1788)
- Dryobotodes tenebrosa (Esper, 1789)
- Dryobotodes carbonis Wagner, 1931
- Dryobotodes eremita (Fabricius, 1775)
- Dryobotodes monochroma (Esper, 1790)
- Dypterygia scabriuscula (Linnaeus, 1758)
- Egira conspicillaris (Linnaeus, 1758)
- Elaphria venustula (Hübner, 1790)
- Enargia abluta (Hübner, 1808)
- Enterpia laudeti (Boisduval, 1840)
- Epilecta linogrisea (Denis & Schiffermuller, 1775)
- Epimecia ustula (Freyer, 1835)
- Epipsilia cervantes (Reisser, 1935)
- Episema glaucina (Esper, 1789)
- Episema korsakovi (Christoph, 1885)
- Episema lederi Christoph, 1885
- Episema tersa (Denis & Schiffermuller, 1775)
- Eremobia ochroleuca (Denis & Schiffermuller, 1775)
- Eucarta amethystina (Hübner, 1803)
- Eucarta virgo (Treitschke, 1835)
- Euchalcia consona (Fabricius, 1787)
- Euchalcia modestoides Poole, 1989
- Eugnorisma depuncta (Linnaeus, 1761)
- Eugraphe sigma (Denis & Schiffermuller, 1775)
- Euplexia lucipara (Linnaeus, 1758)
- Eupsilia transversa (Hufnagel, 1766)
- Euxoa birivia (Denis & Schiffermuller, 1775)
- Euxoa cos (Hübner, 1824)
- Euxoa decora (Denis & Schiffermuller, 1775)
- Euxoa nigricans (Linnaeus, 1761)
- Euxoa nigrofusca (Esper, 1788)
- Euxoa obelisca (Denis & Schiffermuller, 1775)
- Euxoa recussa (Hübner, 1817)
- Euxoa temera (Hübner, 1808)
- Evisa schawerdae Reisser, 1930
- Globia algae (Esper, 1789)
- Gortyna borelii Pierret, 1837
- Gortyna flavago (Denis & Schiffermuller, 1775)
- Gortyna puengeleri (Turati, 1909)
- Graphiphora augur (Fabricius, 1775)
- Griposia aprilina (Linnaeus, 1758)
- Hada plebeja (Linnaeus, 1761)
- Hadena irregularis (Hufnagel, 1766)
- Hadena perplexa (Denis & Schiffermuller, 1775)
- Hadena silenes (Hübner, 1822)
- Hadena syriaca (Osthelder, 1933)
- Hadena adriana (Schawerda, 1921)
- Hadena albimacula (Borkhausen, 1792)
- Hadena caesia (Denis & Schiffermuller, 1775)
- Hadena capsincola (Denis & Schiffermuller, 1775)
- Hadena clara (Staudinger, 1901)
- Hadena compta (Denis & Schiffermuller, 1775)
- Hadena confusa (Hufnagel, 1766)
- Hadena drenowskii (Rebel, 1930)
- Hadena filograna (Esper, 1788)
- Hadena gueneei (Staudinger, 1901)
- Hadena luteocincta (Rambur, 1834)
- Hadena magnolii (Boisduval, 1829)
- Hadena vulcanica (Turati, 1907)
- Haemerosia renalis (Hübner, 1813)
- Hecatera bicolorata (Hufnagel, 1766)
- Hecatera cappa (Hübner, 1809)
- Hecatera dysodea (Denis & Schiffermuller, 1775)
- Helicoverpa armigera (Hübner, 1808)
- Heliothis incarnata Freyer, 1838
- Heliothis maritima Graslin, 1855
- Heliothis nubigera Herrich-Schäffer, 1851
- Heliothis ononis (Denis & Schiffermuller, 1775)
- Heliothis peltigera (Denis & Schiffermuller, 1775)
- Heliothis viriplaca (Hufnagel, 1766)
- Helivictoria victorina (Sodoffsky, 1849)
- Hoplodrina ambigua (Denis & Schiffermuller, 1775)
- Hoplodrina blanda (Denis & Schiffermuller, 1775)
- Hoplodrina octogenaria (Goeze, 1781)
- Hoplodrina respersa (Denis & Schiffermuller, 1775)
- Hoplodrina superstes (Ochsenheimer, 1816)
- Hydraecia micacea (Esper, 1789)
- Hydraecia petasitis Doubleday, 1847
- Hyppa rectilinea (Esper, 1788)
- Ipimorpha retusa (Linnaeus, 1761)
- Ipimorpha subtusa (Denis & Schiffermuller, 1775)
- Janthinea friwaldskii (Duponchel, 1835)
- Jodia croceago (Denis & Schiffermuller, 1775)
- Lacanobia contigua (Denis & Schiffermuller, 1775)
- Lacanobia suasa (Denis & Schiffermuller, 1775)
- Lacanobia thalassina (Hufnagel, 1766)
- Lacanobia aliena (Hübner, 1809)
- Lacanobia blenna (Hübner, 1824)
- Lacanobia oleracea (Linnaeus, 1758)
- Lacanobia splendens (Hübner, 1808)
- Lacanobia w-latinum (Hufnagel, 1766)
- Lamprotes c-aureum (Knoch, 1781)
- Lasionycta proxima (Hübner, 1809)
- Lateroligia ophiogramma (Esper, 1794)
- Lenisa geminipuncta (Haworth, 1809)
- Leucania loreyi (Duponchel, 1827)
- Leucania comma (Linnaeus, 1761)
- Leucania obsoleta (Hübner, 1803)
- Leucania punctosa (Treitschke, 1825)
- Leucania putrescens (Hübner, 1824)
- Leucania zeae (Duponchel, 1827)
- Lithophane furcifera (Hufnagel, 1766)
- Lithophane ledereri (Staudinger, 1892)
- Lithophane merckii (Rambur, 1832)
- Lithophane ornitopus (Hufnagel, 1766)
- Lithophane semibrunnea (Haworth, 1809)
- Lithophane socia (Hufnagel, 1766)
- Lithophane lapidea (Hübner, 1808)
- Litoligia literosa (Haworth, 1809)
- Luperina dumerilii (Duponchel, 1826)
- Luperina nickerlii (Freyer, 1845)
- Luperina rubella (Duponchel, 1835)
- Luperina testacea (Denis & Schiffermuller, 1775)
- Lycophotia erythrina (Herrich-Schäffer, 1852)
- Macdunnoughia confusa (Stephens, 1850)
- Mamestra brassicae (Linnaeus, 1758)
- Maraschia grisescens Osthelder, 1933
- Meganephria bimaculosa (Linnaeus, 1767)
- Mesapamea secalella Remm, 1983
- Mesapamea secalis (Linnaeus, 1758)
- Mesogona acetosellae (Denis & Schiffermuller, 1775)
- Mesoligia furuncula (Denis & Schiffermuller, 1775)
- Mesotrosta signalis (Treitschke, 1829)
- Mniotype adusta (Esper, 1790)
- Mniotype satura (Denis & Schiffermuller, 1775)
- Mniotype solieri (Boisduval, 1829)
- Moma alpium (Osbeck, 1778)
- Mormo maura (Linnaeus, 1758)
- Mythimna riparia (Rambur, 1829)
- Mythimna albipuncta (Denis & Schiffermuller, 1775)
- Mythimna congrua (Hübner, 1817)
- Mythimna ferrago (Fabricius, 1787)
- Mythimna l-album (Linnaeus, 1767)
- Mythimna conigera (Denis & Schiffermuller, 1775)
- Mythimna impura (Hübner, 1808)
- Mythimna pallens (Linnaeus, 1758)
- Mythimna pudorina (Denis & Schiffermuller, 1775)
- Mythimna straminea (Treitschke, 1825)
- Mythimna turca (Linnaeus, 1761)
- Mythimna vitellina (Hübner, 1808)
- Mythimna alopecuri (Boisduval, 1840)
- Mythimna andereggii (Boisduval, 1840)
- Mythimna sicula (Treitschke, 1835)
- Naenia typica (Linnaeus, 1758)
- Noctua comes Hübner, 1813
- Noctua fimbriata (Schreber, 1759)
- Noctua interjecta Hübner, 1803
- Noctua interposita (Hübner, 1790)
- Noctua janthina Denis & Schiffermuller, 1775
- Noctua orbona (Hufnagel, 1766)
- Noctua pronuba (Linnaeus, 1758)
- Noctua tertia Mentzer & al., 1991
- Noctua tirrenica Biebinger, Speidel & Hanigk, 1983
- Nyctobrya amasina Draudt, 1931
- Nyctobrya muralis (Forster, 1771)
- Ochropleura leucogaster (Freyer, 1831)
- Ochropleura plecta (Linnaeus, 1761)
- Oligia fasciuncula (Haworth, 1809)
- Oligia latruncula (Denis & Schiffermuller, 1775)
- Oligia strigilis (Linnaeus, 1758)
- Oligia versicolor (Borkhausen, 1792)
- Olivenebula subsericata (Herrich-Schäffer, 1861)
- Omia cymbalariae (Hübner, 1809)
- Omphalophana anatolica (Lederer, 1857)
- Omphalophana antirrhinii (Hübner, 1803)
- Opigena polygona (Denis & Schiffermuller, 1775)
- Oria musculosa (Hübner, 1808)
- Orthosia gracilis (Denis & Schiffermuller, 1775)
- Orthosia opima (Hübner, 1809)
- Orthosia cerasi (Fabricius, 1775)
- Orthosia cruda (Denis & Schiffermuller, 1775)
- Orthosia dalmatica (Wagner, 1909)
- Orthosia miniosa (Denis & Schiffermuller, 1775)
- Orthosia populeti (Fabricius, 1775)
- Orthosia incerta (Hufnagel, 1766)
- Orthosia gothica (Linnaeus, 1758)
- Oxicesta chamoenices (Herrich-Schäffer, 1845)
- Oxicesta geographica (Fabricius, 1787)
- Oxytripia orbiculosa (Esper, 1799)
- Pachetra sagittigera (Hufnagel, 1766)
- Panchrysia aurea (Hübner, 1803)
- Panchrysia v-argenteum (Esper, 1798)
- Panemeria tenebrata (Scopoli, 1763)
- Panolis flammea (Denis & Schiffermuller, 1775)
- Panthea coenobita (Esper, 1785)
- Papestra biren (Goeze, 1781)
- Parastichtis suspecta (Hübner, 1817)
- Peridroma saucia (Hübner, 1808)
- Perigrapha i-cinctum (Denis & Schiffermuller, 1775)
- Perigrapha rorida Frivaldszky, 1835
- Periphanes delphinii (Linnaeus, 1758)
- Philareta treitschkei (Frivaldszky, 1835)
- Phlogophora meticulosa (Linnaeus, 1758)
- Phlogophora scita (Hübner, 1790)
- Photedes captiuncula (Treitschke, 1825)
- Photedes extrema (Hübner, 1809)
- Photedes minima (Haworth, 1809)
- Photedes morrisii (Dale, 1837)
- Phyllophila obliterata (Rambur, 1833)
- Plusidia cheiranthi (Tauscher, 1809)
- Polia bombycina (Hufnagel, 1766)
- Polia nebulosa (Hufnagel, 1766)
- Polychrysia moneta (Fabricius, 1787)
- Polymixis culoti (Schawerda, 1921)
- Polymixis flavicincta (Denis & Schiffermuller, 1775)
- Polymixis polymita (Linnaeus, 1761)
- Polymixis rufocincta (Geyer, 1828)
- Polymixis serpentina (Treitschke, 1825)
- Polyphaenis sericata (Esper, 1787)
- Praestilbia armeniaca Staudinger, 1892
- Protoschinia scutosa (Denis & Schiffermuller, 1775)
- Pseudeustrotia candidula (Denis & Schiffermuller, 1775)
- Pseudluperina pozzii (Curo, 1883)
- Pyrrhia purpura (Hübner, 1817)
- Pyrrhia umbra (Hufnagel, 1766)
- Rhizedra lutosa (Hübner, 1803)
- Rhyacia lucipeta (Denis & Schiffermuller, 1775)
- Rhyacia simulans (Hufnagel, 1766)
- Rileyiana fovea (Treitschke, 1825)
- Schinia cardui (Hübner, 1790)
- Schinia cognata (Freyer, 1833)
- Scotochrosta pulla (Denis & Schiffermuller, 1775)
- Sesamia cretica Lederer, 1857
- Sesamia nonagrioides Lefebvre, 1827
- Sideridis rivularis (Fabricius, 1775)
- Sideridis implexa (Hübner, 1809)
- Sideridis kitti (Schawerda, 1914)
- Sideridis reticulata (Goeze, 1781)
- Sideridis lampra (Schawerda, 1913)
- Sideridis turbida (Esper, 1790)
- Simyra albovenosa (Goeze, 1781)
- Simyra dentinosa Freyer, 1838
- Simyra nervosa (Denis & Schiffermuller, 1775)
- Spaelotis ravida (Denis & Schiffermuller, 1775)
- Spaelotis senna (Freyer, 1829)
- Spodoptera exigua (Hübner, 1808)
- Standfussiana dalmata (Staudinger, 1901)
- Stenoecia dos (Freyer, 1838)
- Subacronicta megacephala (Denis & Schiffermuller, 1775)
- Syngrapha devergens (Hübner, 1813)
- Synthymia fixa (Fabricius, 1787)
- Teinoptera lunaki (Boursin, 1940)
- Teinoptera olivina (Herrich-Schäffer, 1852)
- Thalpophila matura (Hufnagel, 1766)
- Tholera cespitis (Denis & Schiffermuller, 1775)
- Tholera decimalis (Poda, 1761)
- Thysanoplusia orichalcea (Fabricius, 1775)
- Tiliacea aurago (Denis & Schiffermuller, 1775)
- Tiliacea citrago (Linnaeus, 1758)
- Tiliacea cypreago (Hampson, 1906)
- Tiliacea sulphurago (Denis & Schiffermuller, 1775)
- Trachea atriplicis (Linnaeus, 1758)
- Trichoplusia ni (Hübner, 1803)
- Trichosea ludifica (Linnaeus, 1758)
- Trigonophora flammea (Esper, 1785)
- Tyta luctuosa (Denis & Schiffermuller, 1775)
- Ulochlaena hirta (Hübner, 1813)
- Valeria jaspidea (Villers, 1789)
- Valeria oleagina (Denis & Schiffermuller, 1775)
- Xanthia gilvago (Denis & Schiffermuller, 1775)
- Xanthia icteritia (Hufnagel, 1766)
- Xanthia ocellaris (Borkhausen, 1792)
- Xanthia castanea Osthelder, 1933
- Xanthia togata (Esper, 1788)
- Xestia ashworthii (Doubleday, 1855)
- Xestia c-nigrum (Linnaeus, 1758)
- Xestia ditrapezium (Denis & Schiffermuller, 1775)
- Xestia triangulum (Hufnagel, 1766)
- Xestia speciosa (Hübner, 1813)
- Xestia baja (Denis & Schiffermuller, 1775)
- Xestia castanea (Esper, 1798)
- Xestia cohaesa (Herrich-Schäffer, 1849)
- Xestia collina (Boisduval, 1840)
- Xestia ochreago (Hübner, 1809)
- Xestia stigmatica (Hübner, 1813)
- Xestia xanthographa (Denis & Schiffermuller, 1775)
- Xylena exsoleta (Linnaeus, 1758)
- Xylena lunifera Warren, 1910
- Xylena vetusta (Hübner, 1813)

=== Nolidae ===
- Bena bicolorana (Fuessly, 1775)
- Earias clorana (Linnaeus, 1761)
- Earias vernana (Fabricius, 1787)
- Meganola albula (Denis & Schiffermuller, 1775)
- Meganola strigula (Denis & Schiffermuller, 1775)
- Meganola togatulalis (Hübner, 1796)
- Nola confusalis (Herrich-Schäffer, 1847)
- Nola cristatula (Hübner, 1793)
- Nola cucullatella (Linnaeus, 1758)
- Nola subchlamydula Staudinger, 1871
- Nycteola asiatica (Krulikovsky, 1904)
- Nycteola columbana (Turner, 1925)
- Nycteola revayana (Scopoli, 1772)
- Nycteola siculana (Fuchs, 1899)
- Pseudoips prasinana (Linnaeus, 1758)

=== Notodontidae ===
- Cerura erminea (Esper, 1783)
- Cerura vinula (Linnaeus, 1758)
- Clostera anachoreta (Denis & Schiffermuller, 1775)
- Clostera anastomosis (Linnaeus, 1758)
- Clostera curtula (Linnaeus, 1758)
- Clostera pigra (Hufnagel, 1766)
- Dicranura ulmi (Denis & Schiffermuller, 1775)
- Drymonia dodonaea (Denis & Schiffermuller, 1775)
- Drymonia querna (Denis & Schiffermuller, 1775)
- Drymonia ruficornis (Hufnagel, 1766)
- Furcula bicuspis (Borkhausen, 1790)
- Furcula bifida (Brahm, 1787)
- Furcula furcula (Clerck, 1759)
- Harpyia milhauseri (Fabricius, 1775)
- Notodonta dromedarius (Linnaeus, 1767)
- Notodonta tritophus (Denis & Schiffermuller, 1775)
- Notodonta ziczac (Linnaeus, 1758)
- Paradrymonia vittata (Staudinger, 1892)
- Peridea anceps (Goeze, 1781)
- Phalera bucephala (Linnaeus, 1758)
- Phalera bucephaloides (Ochsenheimer, 1810)
- Pheosia gnoma (Fabricius, 1776)
- Pheosia tremula (Clerck, 1759)
- Pterostoma palpina (Clerck, 1759)
- Ptilodon capucina (Linnaeus, 1758)
- Ptilodon cucullina (Denis & Schiffermuller, 1775)
- Spatalia argentina (Denis & Schiffermuller, 1775)
- Stauropus fagi (Linnaeus, 1758)
- Thaumetopoea pityocampa (Denis & Schiffermuller, 1775)
- Thaumetopoea processionea (Linnaeus, 1758)
- Thaumetopoea solitaria (Freyer, 1838)

=== Oecophoridae ===
- Alabonia geoffrella (Linnaeus, 1767)
- Alabonia staintoniella (Zeller, 1850)
- Batia lunaris (Haworth, 1828)
- Borkhausenia minutella (Linnaeus, 1758)
- Crassa tinctella (Hübner, 1796)
- Dasycera oliviella (Fabricius, 1794)
- Denisia augustella (Hübner, 1796)
- Denisia stipella (Linnaeus, 1758)
- Endrosis sarcitrella (Linnaeus, 1758)
- Epicallima formosella (Denis & Schiffermuller, 1775)
- Epicallima icterinella (Mann, 1867)
- Harpella forficella (Scopoli, 1763)
- Holoscolia huebneri Kocak, 1980
- Kasyniana diminutella (Rebel, 1931)
- Minetia criella (Treitschke, 1835)
- Oecophora bractella (Linnaeus, 1758)
- Pleurota marginella (Denis & Schiffermuller, 1775)
- Pleurota aristella (Linnaeus, 1767)
- Pleurota bicostella (Clerck, 1759)
- Pleurota filigerella Mann, 1867
- Pleurota pungitiella Herrich-Schäffer, 1854
- Pleurota pyropella (Denis & Schiffermuller, 1775)
- Pleurota punctella (O. Costa, 1836)
- Schiffermuelleria schaefferella (Linnaeus, 1758)

=== Opostegidae ===
- Opostega salaciella (Treitschke, 1833)
- Pseudopostega crepusculella (Zeller, 1839)

=== Peleopodidae ===
- Carcina quercana (Fabricius, 1775)

=== Plutellidae ===
- Eidophasia messingiella (Fischer von Röslerstamm, 1840)
- Eidophasia syenitella Herrich-Schäffer, 1854
- Plutella xylostella (Linnaeus, 1758)
- Plutella porrectella (Linnaeus, 1758)
- Rhigognostis hufnagelii (Zeller, 1839)

=== Praydidae ===
- Prays oleae (Bernard, 1788)

=== Psychidae ===
- Acanthopsyche zelleri (Mann, 1855)
- Anaproutia comitella (Bruand, 1853)
- Anaproutia reticulatella (Bruand, 1853)
- Bijugis bombycella (Denis & Schiffermuller, 1775)
- Brevantennia adriatica (Rebel, 1919)
- Canephora hirsuta (Poda, 1761)
- Dahlica triquetrella (Hübner, 1813)
- Diplodoma laichartingella Goeze, 1783
- Eumasia parietariella (Heydenreich, 1851)
- Narycia duplicella (Goeze, 1783)
- Pachythelia villosella (Ochsenheimer, 1810)
- Psyche casta (Pallas, 1767)
- Psyche crassiorella Bruand, 1851
- Ptilocephala biroi (Rebel, 1909)
- Rebelia perlucidella (Bruand, 1853)
- Rebelia sapho (Milliere, 1864)
- Taleporia autumnella Rebel, 1919
- Taleporia politella (Ochsenheimer, 1816)
- Taleporia tubulosa (Retzius, 1783)

=== Pterophoridae ===
- Adaina microdactyla (Hübner, 1813)
- Agdistis bennetii (Curtis, 1833)
- Agdistis meridionalis (Zeller, 1847)
- Agdistis tamaricis (Zeller, 1847)
- Amblyptilia acanthadactyla (Hübner, 1813)
- Calyciphora albodactylus (Fabricius, 1794)
- Calyciphora homoiodactyla (Kasy, 1960)
- Capperia celeusi (Frey, 1886)
- Capperia fusca (O. Hofmann, 1898)
- Capperia hellenica Adamczewski, 1951
- Capperia maratonica Adamczewski, 1951
- Capperia polonica Adamczewski, 1951
- Cnaemidophorus rhododactyla (Denis & Schiffermuller, 1775)
- Crombrugghia distans (Zeller, 1847)
- Crombrugghia laetus (Zeller, 1847)
- Crombrugghia tristis (Zeller, 1841)
- Emmelina monodactyla (Linnaeus, 1758)
- Gillmeria ochrodactyla (Denis & Schiffermuller, 1775)
- Gypsochares baptodactylus (Zeller, 1850)
- Hellinsia carphodactyla (Hübner, 1813)
- Hellinsia inulae (Zeller, 1852)
- Hellinsia lienigianus (Zeller, 1852)
- Hellinsia osteodactylus (Zeller, 1841)
- Merrifieldia baliodactylus (Zeller, 1841)
- Merrifieldia leucodactyla (Denis & Schiffermuller, 1775)
- Merrifieldia malacodactylus (Zeller, 1847)
- Merrifieldia tridactyla (Linnaeus, 1758)
- Oidaematophorus lithodactyla (Treitschke, 1833)
- Oxyptilus parvidactyla (Haworth, 1811)
- Oxyptilus pilosellae (Zeller, 1841)
- Paraplatyptilia metzneri (Zeller, 1841)
- Platyptilia calodactyla (Denis & Schiffermuller, 1775)
- Platyptilia gonodactyla (Denis & Schiffermuller, 1775)
- Procapperia linariae (Chretien, 1922)
- Pselnophorus heterodactyla (Muller, 1764)
- Pterophorus ischnodactyla (Treitschke, 1835)
- Pterophorus pentadactyla (Linnaeus, 1758)
- Stangeia siceliota (Zeller, 1847)
- Stenoptilia aridus (Zeller, 1847)
- Stenoptilia bipunctidactyla (Scopoli, 1763)
- Stenoptilia pterodactyla (Linnaeus, 1761)
- Stenoptilia stigmatodactylus (Zeller, 1852)
- Stenoptilia zophodactylus (Duponchel, 1840)
- Wheeleria obsoletus (Zeller, 1841)

=== Pyralidae ===
- Achroia grisella (Fabricius, 1794)
- Acrobasis advenella (Zincken, 1818)
- Acrobasis bithynella Zeller, 1848
- Acrobasis centunculella (Mann, 1859)
- Acrobasis consociella (Hübner, 1813)
- Acrobasis dulcella (Zeller, 1848)
- Acrobasis getuliella (Zerny, 1914)
- Acrobasis glaucella Staudinger, 1859
- Acrobasis legatea (Haworth, 1811)
- Acrobasis marmorea (Haworth, 1811)
- Acrobasis obliqua (Zeller, 1847)
- Acrobasis obtusella (Hübner, 1796)
- Acrobasis porphyrella (Duponchel, 1836)
- Acrobasis repandana (Fabricius, 1798)
- Acrobasis sodalella Zeller, 1848
- Acrobasis suavella (Zincken, 1818)
- Acrobasis tumidana (Denis & Schiffermuller, 1775)
- Aglossa caprealis (Hübner, 1809)
- Aglossa pinguinalis (Linnaeus, 1758)
- Alophia combustella (Herrich-Schäffer, 1855)
- Amphithrix sublineatella (Staudinger, 1859)
- Ancylodes pallens Ragonot, 1887
- Ancylosis cinnamomella (Duponchel, 1836)
- Ancylosis oblitella (Zeller, 1848)
- Ancylosis roscidella (Eversmann, 1844)
- Ancylosis sareptalla (Herrich-Schäffer, 1861)
- Anerastia lotella (Hübner, 1813)
- Aphomia sociella (Linnaeus, 1758)
- Aphomia zelleri de Joannis, 1932
- Apomyelois ceratoniae (Zeller, 1839)
- Asalebria florella (Mann, 1862)
- Bostra obsoletalis (Mann, 1884)
- Bradyrrhoa cantenerella (Duponchel, 1837)
- Bradyrrhoa confiniella Zeller, 1848
- Bradyrrhoa trapezella (Duponchel, 1836)
- Cadra abstersella (Zeller, 1847)
- Cadra cautella (Walker, 1863)
- Cadra figulilella (Gregson, 1871)
- Cadra furcatella (Herrich-Schäffer, 1849)
- Catastia marginea (Denis & Schiffermuller, 1775)
- Cryptoblabes bistriga (Haworth, 1811)
- Dectocera pseudolimbella Ragonot, 1887
- Delplanqueia dilutella (Denis & Schiffermuller, 1775)
- Denticera divisella (Duponchel, 1842)
- Dioryctria abietella (Denis & Schiffermuller, 1775)
- Dioryctria mendacella (Staudinger, 1859)
- Dioryctria pineae (Staudinger, 1859)
- Dioryctria robiniella (Milliere, 1865)
- Dioryctria sylvestrella (Ratzeburg, 1840)
- Eccopisa effractella Zeller, 1848
- Elegia fallax (Staudinger, 1881)
- Elegia similella (Zincken, 1818)
- Ematheudes punctella (Treitschke, 1833)
- Endotricha flammealis (Denis & Schiffermuller, 1775)
- Ephestia disparella Hampson, 1901
- Ephestia elutella (Hübner, 1796)
- Ephestia parasitella Staudinger, 1859
- Ephestia unicolorella Staudinger, 1881
- Ephestia welseriella (Zeller, 1848)
- Epidauria strigosa (Staudinger, 1879)
- Epidauria transversariella (Zeller, 1848)
- Epischnia cretaciella Mann, 1869
- Epischnia illotella Zeller, 1839
- Epischnia leucoloma Herrich-Schäffer, 1849
- Epischnia prodromella (Hübner, 1799)
- Episcythrastis tetricella (Denis & Schiffermuller, 1775)
- Etiella zinckenella (Treitschke, 1832)
- Eucarphia vinetella (Fabricius, 1787)
- Eurhodope cirrigerella (Zincken, 1818)
- Eurhodope rosella (Scopoli, 1763)
- Euzophera bigella (Zeller, 1848)
- Euzophera cinerosella (Zeller, 1839)
- Euzophera osseatella (Treitschke, 1832)
- Euzopherodes lutisignella (Mann, 1869)
- Euzopherodes vapidella (Mann, 1857)
- Galleria mellonella (Linnaeus, 1758)
- Glyptoteles leucacrinella Zeller, 1848
- Gymnancyla canella (Denis & Schiffermuller, 1775)
- Gymnancyla hornigii (Lederer, 1852)
- Homoeosoma gravosellum Roesler, 1965
- Homoeosoma nebulella (Denis & Schiffermuller, 1775)
- Homoeosoma nimbella (Duponchel, 1837)
- Homoeosoma sinuella (Fabricius, 1794)
- Hypochalcia ahenella (Denis & Schiffermuller, 1775)
- Hypochalcia decorella (Hübner, 1810)
- Hypochalcia lignella (Hübner, 1796)
- Hypotia corticalis (Denis & Schiffermuller, 1775)
- Hypotia massilialis (Duponchel, 1832)
- Hypsopygia costalis (Fabricius, 1775)
- Hypsopygia fulvocilialis (Duponchel, 1834)
- Hypsopygia glaucinalis (Linnaeus, 1758)
- Hypsopygia incarnatalis (Zeller, 1847)
- Hypsopygia rubidalis (Denis & Schiffermuller, 1775)
- Hypsotropa limbella Zeller, 1848
- Hypsotropa vulneratella (Zeller, 1847)
- Insalebria serraticornella (Zeller, 1839)
- Isauria dilucidella (Duponchel, 1836)
- Khorassania compositella (Treitschke, 1835)
- Lamoria anella (Denis & Schiffermuller, 1775)
- Matilella fusca (Haworth, 1811)
- Merulempista cingillella (Zeller, 1846)
- Metallostichodes nigrocyanella (Constant, 1865)
- Moitrelia obductella (Zeller, 1839)
- Myelois circumvoluta (Fourcroy, 1785)
- Nephopterix angustella (Hübner, 1796)
- Nyctegretis lineana (Scopoli, 1786)
- Oncocera semirubella (Scopoli, 1763)
- Oxybia transversella (Duponchel, 1836)
- Pempelia albariella Zeller, 1839
- Pempelia amoenella (Zeller, 1848)
- Pempelia palumbella (Denis & Schiffermuller, 1775)
- Pempeliella ornatella (Denis & Schiffermuller, 1775)
- Pempeliella sororiella Zeller, 1839
- Phycita coronatella (Guenee, 1845)
- Phycita meliella (Mann, 1864)
- Phycita metzneri (Zeller, 1846)
- Phycita poteriella (Zeller, 1846)
- Phycita roborella (Denis & Schiffermuller, 1775)
- Phycitodes binaevella (Hübner, 1813)
- Plodia interpunctella (Hübner, 1813)
- Psorosa dahliella (Treitschke, 1832)
- Psorosa mediterranella Amsel, 1953
- Psorosa tergestella Ragonot, 1901
- Pterothrixidia rufella (Duponchel, 1836)
- Pyralis farinalis (Linnaeus, 1758)
- Pyralis regalis Denis & Schiffermuller, 1775
- Rhodophaea formosa (Haworth, 1811)
- Sciota insignella (Mann, 1862)
- Selagia argyrella (Denis & Schiffermuller, 1775)
- Selagia spadicella (Hübner, 1796)
- Seleucia pectinella (Chretien, 1911)
- Seleucia semirosella Ragonot, 1887
- Stemmatophora brunnealis (Treitschke, 1829)
- Stemmatophora combustalis (Fischer v. Röslerstamm, 1842)
- Stemmatophora honestalis (Treitschke, 1829)
- Synaphe antennalis (Fabricius, 1794)
- Synaphe moldavica (Esper, 1794)
- Synaphe punctalis (Fabricius, 1775)
- Trachonitis cristella (Denis & Schiffermuller, 1775)
- Valdovecaria umbratella (Treitschke, 1832)
- Vitula biviella (Zeller, 1848)

=== Saturniidae ===
- Aglia tau (Linnaeus, 1758)
- Antheraea yamamai (Guerin-Meneville, 1861)
- Samia cynthia (Drury, 1773)
- Saturnia pavoniella (Scopoli, 1763)
- Saturnia spini (Denis & Schiffermuller, 1775)
- Saturnia caecigena Kupido, 1825
- Saturnia pyri (Denis & Schiffermuller, 1775)

=== Scythrididae ===
- Enolmis desidella (Lederer, 1855)
- Scythris albidella (Stainton, 1867)
- Scythris crypta Hannemann, 1961
- Scythris cuspidella (Denis & Schiffermuller, 1775)
- Scythris disparella (Tengstrom, 1848)
- Scythris dissimilella (Herrich-Schäffer, 1855)
- Scythris ericetella (Heinemann, 1872)
- Scythris hornigii (Zeller, 1855)
- Scythris hungaricella Rebel, 1917
- Scythris laminella (Denis & Schiffermuller, 1775)
- Scythris moldavicella Caradja, 1905
- Scythris oelandicella Muller-Rutz, 1922
- Scythris productella (Zeller, 1839)
- Scythris ridiculella Caradja, 1920
- Scythris schleichiella (Zeller, 1870)
- Scythris subschleichiella Hannemann, 1961
- Scythris tabidella (Herrich-Schäffer, 1855)
- Scythris vittella (O. Costa, 1834)

=== Sesiidae ===
- Bembecia albanensis (Rebel, 1918)
- Bembecia himmighoffeni (Staudinger, 1866)
- Bembecia ichneumoniformis (Denis & Schiffermuller, 1775)
- Bembecia megillaeformis (Hübner, 1813)
- Bembecia pavicevici Tosevski, 1989
- Bembecia scopigera (Scopoli, 1763)
- Bembecia uroceriformis (Treitschke, 1834)
- Chamaesphecia aerifrons (Zeller, 1847)
- Chamaesphecia alysoniformis (Herrich-Schäffer, 1846)
- Chamaesphecia annellata (Zeller, 1847)
- Chamaesphecia astatiformis (Herrich-Schäffer, 1846)
- Chamaesphecia bibioniformis (Esper, 1800)
- Chamaesphecia chalciformis (Esper, 1804)
- Chamaesphecia doleriformis (Herrich-Schäffer, 1846)
- Chamaesphecia dumonti Le Cerf, 1922
- Chamaesphecia empiformis (Esper, 1783)
- Chamaesphecia euceraeformis (Ochsenheimer, 1816)
- Chamaesphecia hungarica (Tomala, 1901)
- Chamaesphecia leucopsiformis (Esper, 1800)
- Chamaesphecia masariformis (Ochsenheimer, 1808)
- Chamaesphecia nigrifrons (Le Cerf, 1911)
- Chamaesphecia palustris Kautz, 1927
- Chamaesphecia schmidtiiformis (Freyer, 1836)
- Chamaesphecia tenthrediniformis (Denis & Schiffermuller, 1775)
- Paranthrene diaphana Dalla Torre & Strand, 1925
- Paranthrene insolitus Le Cerf, 1914
- Paranthrene tabaniformis (Rottemburg, 1775)
- Pennisetia hylaeiformis (Laspeyres, 1801)
- Pyropteron affinis (Staudinger, 1856)
- Pyropteron chrysidiformis (Esper, 1782)
- Pyropteron leucomelaena (Zeller, 1847)
- Pyropteron muscaeformis (Esper, 1783)
- Pyropteron triannuliformis (Freyer, 1843)
- Sesia apiformis (Clerck, 1759)
- Sesia melanocephala Dalman, 1816
- Synanthedon andrenaeformis (Laspeyres, 1801)
- Synanthedon cephiformis (Ochsenheimer, 1808)
- Synanthedon conopiformis (Esper, 1782)
- Synanthedon culiciformis (Linnaeus, 1758)
- Synanthedon flaviventris (Staudinger, 1883)
- Synanthedon formicaeformis (Esper, 1783)
- Synanthedon loranthi (Kralicek, 1966)
- Synanthedon melliniformis (Laspeyres, 1801)
- Synanthedon myopaeformis (Borkhausen, 1789)
- Synanthedon spheciformis (Denis & Schiffermuller, 1775)
- Synanthedon spuleri (Fuchs, 1908)
- Synanthedon stomoxiformis (Hübner, 1790)
- Synanthedon tipuliformis (Clerck, 1759)
- Synanthedon vespiformis (Linnaeus, 1761)
- Tinthia brosiformis (Hübner, 1813)
- Tinthia tineiformis (Esper, 1789)

=== Sphingidae ===
- Acherontia atropos (Linnaeus, 1758)
- Agrius convolvuli (Linnaeus, 1758)
- Daphnis nerii (Linnaeus, 1758)
- Deilephila elpenor (Linnaeus, 1758)
- Deilephila porcellus (Linnaeus, 1758)
- Hemaris croatica (Esper, 1800)
- Hemaris fuciformis (Linnaeus, 1758)
- Hemaris tityus (Linnaeus, 1758)
- Hippotion celerio (Linnaeus, 1758)
- Hyles euphorbiae (Linnaeus, 1758)
- Hyles hippophaes (Esper, 1789)
- Hyles livornica (Esper, 1780)
- Hyles vespertilio (Esper, 1780)
- Laothoe populi (Linnaeus, 1758)
- Macroglossum stellatarum (Linnaeus, 1758)
- Marumba quercus (Denis & Schiffermuller, 1775)
- Mimas tiliae (Linnaeus, 1758)
- Proserpinus proserpina (Pallas, 1772)
- Smerinthus ocellata (Linnaeus, 1758)
- Sphingoneopsis gorgoniades (Hübner, 1819)
- Sphinx ligustri Linnaeus, 1758
- Sphinx pinastri Linnaeus, 1758

=== Thyrididae ===
- Thyris fenestrella (Scopoli, 1763)

=== Tineidae ===
- Anomalotinea gardesanella (Hartig, 1950)
- Anomalotinea liguriella (Milliere, 1879)
- Ateliotum hungaricellum Zeller, 1839
- Cephimallota angusticostella (Zeller, 1839)
- Cephimallota crassiflavella Bruand, 1851
- Ceratuncus danubiella (Mann, 1866)
- Eudarcia nigraella (Mariani, 1937)
- Eudarcia confusella (Heydenreich, 1851)
- Eudarcia croaticum (Petersen, 1962)
- Eudarcia granulatella (Zeller, 1852)
- Euplocamus anthracinalis (Scopoli, 1763)
- Infurcitinea albicomella (Stainton, 1851)
- Infurcitinea banatica Petersen, 1961
- Infurcitinea captans Gozmany, 1960
- Infurcitinea finalis Gozmany, 1959
- Infurcitinea nedae Gaedike, 1983
- Infurcitinea rebeliella (Krone, 1907)
- Ischnoscia borreonella (Milliere, 1874)
- Lichenotinea pustulatella (Zeller, 1852)
- Monopis crocicapitella (Clemens, 1859)
- Monopis imella (Hübner, 1813)
- Monopis laevigella (Denis & Schiffermuller, 1775)
- Monopis obviella (Denis & Schiffermuller, 1775)
- Montetinea tenuicornella (Klimesch, 1942)
- Morophaga choragella (Denis & Schiffermuller, 1775)
- Morophaga morella (Duponchel, 1838)
- Nemapogon clematella (Fabricius, 1781)
- Nemapogon cloacella (Haworth, 1828)
- Nemapogon falstriella (Bang-Haas, 1881)
- Nemapogon granella (Linnaeus, 1758)
- Nemapogon gravosaellus Petersen, 1957
- Nemapogon hungaricus Gozmany, 1960
- Nemapogon inconditella (Lucas, 1956)
- Nemapogon nigralbella (Zeller, 1839)
- Nemapogon signatellus Petersen, 1957
- Nemapogon variatella (Clemens, 1859)
- Nemapogon wolffiella Karsholt & Nielsen, 1976
- Neurothaumasia ankerella (Mann, 1867)
- Neurothaumasia macedonica Petersen, 1962
- Niditinea fuscella (Linnaeus, 1758)
- Novotinea klimeschi (Rebel, 1940)
- Proterospastis merdella (Zeller, 1847)
- Reisserita relicinella (Herrich-Schäffer, 1853)
- Scardia boletella (Fabricius, 1794)
- Tenaga nigripunctella (Haworth, 1828)
- Tenaga rhenania (Petersen, 1962)
- Tinea basifasciella Ragonot, 1895
- Tinea dubiella Stainton, 1859
- Tinea flavescentella Haworth, 1828
- Tinea nonimella (Zagulajev, 1955)
- Tinea pellionella Linnaeus, 1758
- Tinea translucens Meyrick, 1917
- Tinea trinotella Thunberg, 1794
- Tineola bisselliella (Hummel, 1823)
- Triaxomasia caprimulgella (Stainton, 1851)
- Triaxomera fulvimitrella (Sodoffsky, 1830)
- Triaxomera parasitella (Hübner, 1796)
- Trichophaga bipartitella (Ragonot, 1892)
- Trichophaga tapetzella (Linnaeus, 1758)

=== Tischeriidae ===
- Coptotriche angusticollella (Duponchel, 1843)
- Coptotriche marginea (Haworth, 1828)
- Tischeria ekebladella (Bjerkander, 1795)

=== Tortricidae ===
- Acleris aspersana (Hübner, 1817)
- Acleris bergmanniana (Linnaeus, 1758)
- Acleris boscanoides Razowski, 1959
- Acleris permutana (Duponchel, 1836)
- Aethes bilbaensis (Rossler, 1877)
- Aethes deaurana (Peyerimhoff, 1877)
- Aethes nefandana (Kennel, 1899)
- Aethes tesserana (Denis & Schiffermuller, 1775)
- Aphelia unitana (Hübner, 1799)
- Clepsis pallidana (Fabricius, 1776)
- Cnephasia cupressivorana (Staudinger, 1871)
- Cnephasia ecullyana Real, 1951
- Cnephasia longana (Haworth, 1811)
- Cnephasia incertana (Treitschke, 1835)
- Cochylidia heydeniana (Herrich-Schäffer, 1851)
- Cochylidia moguntiana (Rossler, 1864)
- Cochylidia rupicola (Curtis, 1834)
- Cochylimorpha elongana (Fischer v. Röslerstamm, 1839)
- Cochylimorpha jucundana (Treitschke, 1835)
- Cochylimorpha perfusana (Guenee, 1845)
- Cochylis epilinana Duponchel, 1842
- Cochylis hybridella (Hübner, 1813)
- Cochylis molliculana Zeller, 1847
- Cochylis nana (Haworth, 1811)
- Cochylis roseana (Haworth, 1811)
- Crocidosema plebejana Zeller, 1847
- Cryptocochylis conjunctana (Mann, 1864)
- Cydia pomonella (Linnaeus, 1758)
- Diceratura roseofasciana (Mann, 1855)
- Dichrorampha pastoralisi Razowksi & Tokar, 2003
- Dichrorampha sequana (Hübner, 1799)
- Epinotia dalmatana (Rebel, 1891)
- Eucosma albuneana (Zeller, 1847)
- Eucosma conformana (Mann, 1872)
- Eucosma gradensis (Galvagni, 1909)
- Eugnosta lathoniana (Hübner, 1800)
- Exapate congelatella (Clerck, 1759)
- Falseuncaria degreyana (McLachlan, 1869)
- Gynnidomorpha rubricana (Peyerimhoff, 1877)
- Hysterophora maculosana (Haworth, 1811)
- Isotrias rectifasciana (Haworth, 1811)
- Lobesia andereggiana (Herrich-Schäffer, 1851)
- Neosphaleroptera nubilana (Hübner, 1799)
- Pelochrista agrestana (Treitschke, 1830)
- Pelochrista fusculana (Zeller, 1847)
- Pelochrista latericiana (Rebel, 1919)
- Pelochrista mollitana (Zeller, 1847)
- Phalonidia affinitana (Douglas, 1846)
- Phalonidia contractana (Zeller, 1847)
- Phtheochroa duponchelana (Duponchel, 1843)
- Phtheochroa fulvicinctana (Constant, 1893)
- Phtheochroa inopiana (Haworth, 1811)
- Phtheochroa pulvillana Herrich-Schäffer, 1851
- Phtheochroa purana (Guenee, 1845)
- Phtheochroa sodaliana (Haworth, 1811)
- Prochlidonia amiantana (Hübner, 1799)
- Rhyacionia hafneri (Rebel, 1937)

=== Yponomeutidae ===
- Kessleria alpicella (Stainton, 1851)
- Paradoxus osyridellus Stainton, 1869
- Scythropia crataegella (Linnaeus, 1767)

=== Ypsolophidae ===
- Ochsenheimeria taurella (Denis & Schiffermuller, 1775)
- Ypsolopha albiramella (Mann, 1861)
- Ypsolopha alpella (Denis & Schiffermuller, 1775)
- Ypsolopha asperella (Linnaeus, 1761)
- Ypsolopha dentella (Fabricius, 1775)
- Ypsolopha instabilella (Mann, 1866)
- Ypsolopha lucella (Fabricius, 1775)
- Ypsolopha parenthesella (Linnaeus, 1761)
- Ypsolopha persicella (Fabricius, 1787)
- Ypsolopha scabrella (Linnaeus, 1761)
- Ypsolopha sculpturella (Herrich-Schäffer, 1854)
- Ypsolopha semitessella (Mann, 1861)
- Ypsolopha sylvella (Linnaeus, 1767)
- Ypsolopha trichonella (Mann, 1861)

=== Zygaenidae ===
- Adscita geryon (Hübner, 1813)
- Adscita statices (Linnaeus, 1758)
- Adscita mannii (Lederer, 1853)
- Jordanita chloros (Hübner, 1813)
- Jordanita globulariae (Hübner, 1793)
- Jordanita graeca (Jordan, 1907)
- Jordanita subsolana (Staudinger, 1862)
- Jordanita budensis (Ad. & Au. Speyer, 1858)
- Jordanita notata (Zeller, 1847)
- Rhagades pruni (Denis & Schiffermuller, 1775)
- Theresimima ampellophaga (Bayle-Barelle, 1808)
- Zygaena carniolica (Scopoli, 1763)
- Zygaena brizae (Esper, 1800)
- Zygaena cynarae (Esper, 1789)
- Zygaena punctum Ochsenheimer, 1808
- Zygaena purpuralis (Brunnich, 1763)
- Zygaena angelicae Ochsenheimer, 1808
- Zygaena ephialtes (Linnaeus, 1767)
- Zygaena filipendulae (Linnaeus, 1758)
- Zygaena lonicerae (Scheven, 1777)
- Zygaena loti (Denis & Schiffermuller, 1775)
- Zygaena osterodensis Reiss, 1921
- Zygaena transalpina (Esper, 1780)
- Zygaena viciae (Denis & Schiffermuller, 1775)
