= P. amseli =

P. amseli may refer to:

- Parapsectris amseli, a twirler moth
- Photedes amseli, an owlet moth
- Phyllonorycter amseli, a leaf miner
- Protancylis amseli, a tortrix moth
