= Coleophora angustiorella =

Scientific classification
- Kingdom: Animalia
- Phylum: Arthropoda
- Class: Insecta
- Order: Lepidoptera
- Family: Coleophoridae
- Genus: Coleophora
- Species: C. angustiorella

Binomial name
- Coleophora angustiorella Fuchs, 1903

Species of moth

Coleophora angustiorella is a moth of the family Coleophoridae that can be found in southern European countries such as Croatia, Italy, and North Macedonia, Turkey and Armenia.

The length of the forewings is 4–4.5 millimetres (0.16–0.18 in). Adults are on wing in late spring.
