= Scrobipalpa hungariae =

Scientific classification
- Kingdom: Animalia
- Phylum: Arthropoda
- Class: Insecta
- Order: Lepidoptera
- Family: Gelechiidae
- Genus: Scrobipalpa
- Species: S. hungariae

Binomial name
- Scrobipalpa hungariae (Staudinger, 1871)

Synonyms
- Gelechia hungariae Staudinger, 1871

Species of moth

Scrobipalpa hungariae is a moth in the family Gelechiidae. It was described by Otto Staudinger in 1871. It lives in Austria, Croatia, Hungary and Ukraine.

The wingspan is 14–19 mm (0.55–0.75 in). The ground colour of the forewings is uniform greyish-black.
