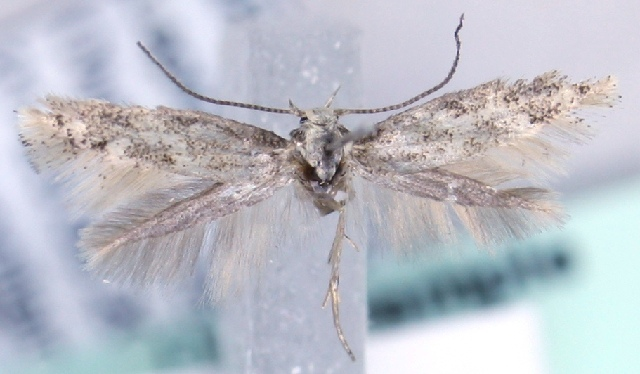

Scientific classification
- Domain: Eukaryota
- Kingdom: Animalia
- Phylum: Arthropoda
- Class: Insecta
- Order: Lepidoptera
- Family: Elachistidae
- Genus: Elachista
- Species: E. graeca

Binomial name
- Elachista graeca Parenti, 2002

= Elachista graeca =

Species of moth

Elachista graeca is a moth of the family Elachistidae that is found in Greece and Croatia.
