= Coleophora drymidis =

Scientific classification
- Kingdom: Animalia
- Phylum: Arthropoda
- Class: Insecta
- Order: Lepidoptera
- Family: Coleophoridae
- Genus: Coleophora
- Species: C. drymidis

Binomial name
- Coleophora drymidis Mann, 1857

Species of moth

Coleophora drymidis is a moth of the family Coleophoridae. It is found in Croatia and Greece.

The larvae feed on Drypis spinosa. Full-grown larvae can be found in June.
