= Elachista vegliae =

Scientific classification
- Domain: Eukaryota
- Kingdom: Animalia
- Phylum: Arthropoda
- Class: Insecta
- Order: Lepidoptera
- Family: Elachistidae
- Genus: Elachista
- Species: E. vegliae

Binomial name
- Elachista vegliae Parenti, 1978

Species of moth

Elachista vegliae is a moth of the family Elachistidae. It is found in Croatia, North Macedonia, Bulgaria and Turkey.
