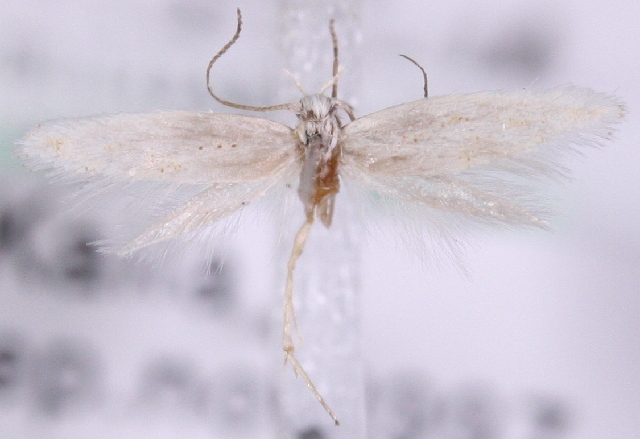

Scientific classification
- Domain: Eukaryota
- Kingdom: Animalia
- Phylum: Arthropoda
- Class: Insecta
- Order: Lepidoptera
- Family: Elachistidae
- Genus: Elachista
- Species: E. constitella

Binomial name
- Elachista constitella Frey, 1859

= Elachista constitella =

Species of moth

Elachista constitella is a moth of the family Elachistidae. It is found in Turkey, Italy, Croatia and Russia.
