= Dioryctria pineae =

Scientific classification
- Domain: Eukaryota
- Kingdom: Animalia
- Phylum: Arthropoda
- Class: Insecta
- Order: Lepidoptera
- Family: Pyralidae
- Genus: Dioryctria
- Species: D. pineae

Binomial name
- Dioryctria pineae (Staudinger, 1859)

Synonyms
- Nephopterix pineae Staudinger, 1859

Species of moth

Dioryctria pineae is a species of snout moth in the genus Dioryctria. It was described by Otto Staudinger in 1859 and is known from the Iberian Peninsula, France, Italy, Croatia and Greece.

The wingspan is 36–37 mm.
