= Scoparia perplexella =

Scientific classification
- Kingdom: Animalia
- Phylum: Arthropoda
- Clade: Pancrustacea
- Class: Insecta
- Order: Lepidoptera
- Family: Crambidae
- Genus: Scoparia
- Species: S. perplexella

Binomial name
- Scoparia perplexella (Zeller, 1839)

Synonyms
- Eudorea perplexella Zeller, 1839; Scoparia perplexella dufayi Leraut, 1982

Species of moth

Scoparia perplexella is a species of moth in the family Crambidae. It is found in Greece, North Macedonia, Croatia and on Sardinia.
