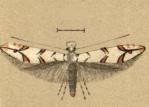

Scientific classification
- Domain: Eukaryota
- Kingdom: Animalia
- Phylum: Arthropoda
- Class: Insecta
- Order: Lepidoptera
- Family: Gracillariidae
- Genus: Phyllonorycter
- Species: P. fiumella

Binomial name
- Phyllonorycter fiumella (Krone, 1910)

Synonyms
- Lithocolletis fiumella Krone, 1910; Phyllonorycter ochreojunctella (Klimesch, 1942)

= Phyllonorycter fiumella =

Species of moth

Phyllonorycter fiumella is a moth of the family Gracillariidae. It is known from Croatia, France, Italy and North Macedonia.

The larvae feed on Acer monspessulanum.
