= Phyllonorycter lapadiella =

Scientific classification
- Domain: Eukaryota
- Kingdom: Animalia
- Phylum: Arthropoda
- Class: Insecta
- Order: Lepidoptera
- Family: Gracillariidae
- Genus: Phyllonorycter
- Species: P. lapadiella

Binomial name
- Phyllonorycter lapadiella (Krone, 1909)

Synonyms
- Lithocolletis lapadiella Krone, 1909; Lithocolletis dalmatinella Amsel, 1951; Phyllonorycter picardi Buvat, 1995

Species of moth

Phyllonorycter lapadiella is a moth of the family Gracillariidae. It is known from Croatia, Serbia, Greece, France, Italy and Sicily.

Adults are on wing from April to September in two or more generations per year. Adults of the summer and autumn generations are distinctly smaller.

The larvae feed on Spartium junceum. They mine the stem of their host plant.
