= Bucculatrix zizyphella =

Scientific classification
- Kingdom: Animalia
- Phylum: Arthropoda
- Clade: Pancrustacea
- Class: Insecta
- Order: Lepidoptera
- Family: Bucculatricidae
- Genus: Bucculatrix
- Species: B. zizyphella

Binomial name
- Bucculatrix zizyphella Chrétien, 1907

Synonyms
- Bucculatrix spinachristi Amsel, 1935

Species of moth

Bucculatrix zizyphella is a moth in the family Bucculatricidae. It was described by Pierre Chrétien in 1907. It is found in former Yugoslavia, North Macedonia and Algeria.

The wingspan is 5–6 mm.

The larvae feed on Zizyphus lotus. They mine the leaves of their host plant.
