= Acleris boscanoides =

Scientific classification
- Kingdom: Animalia
- Phylum: Arthropoda
- Class: Insecta
- Order: Lepidoptera
- Family: Tortricidae
- Genus: Acleris
- Species: A. boscanoides

Binomial name
- Acleris boscanoides Razowski, 1959

Species of moth

Acleris boscanoides is a species of moth of the family Tortricidae. It is found in Ukraine, Croatia, Bulgaria, North Macedonia, Greece, Turkey and the Near East.

The wingspan is 14–17 mm. Adults are on wing from January to April and from May to October.

The larvae feed on Ulmus species.
