= Coleophora macedonica =

Scientific classification
- Kingdom: Animalia
- Phylum: Arthropoda
- Class: Insecta
- Order: Lepidoptera
- Family: Coleophoridae
- Genus: Coleophora
- Species: C. macedonica

Binomial name
- Coleophora macedonica Toll, 1959

Species of moth

Coleophora macedonica is a moth of the family Coleophoridae. It is found in Italy, Croatia and North Macedonia.

The larvae feed on the leaves of Hyssopus officinalis and possibly Thymus species.
