= Coleophora helichrysiella =

Scientific classification
- Kingdom: Animalia
- Phylum: Arthropoda
- Class: Insecta
- Order: Lepidoptera
- Family: Coleophoridae
- Genus: Coleophora
- Species: C. helichrysiella

Binomial name
- Coleophora helichrysiella Krone, 1909

Species of moth

Coleophora helichrysiella is a moth of the family Coleophoridae. It is found in Europe south of the line running from France to North Macedonia and Romania. Full-grown cases can be found in May.
