= Coleophora meridionella =

Scientific classification
- Kingdom: Animalia
- Phylum: Arthropoda
- Class: Insecta
- Order: Lepidoptera
- Family: Coleophoridae
- Genus: Coleophora
- Species: C. meridionella

Binomial name
- Coleophora meridionella Rebel, 1912

Species of moth

Coleophora meridionella is a moth of the family Coleophoridae. It is found from Austria to Italy and from France to Greece.
