= Coleophora uralensis =

Scientific classification
- Kingdom: Animalia
- Phylum: Arthropoda
- Class: Insecta
- Order: Lepidoptera
- Family: Coleophoridae
- Genus: Coleophora
- Species: C. uralensis

Binomial name
- Coleophora uralensis Toll, 1961

Species of moth

Coleophora uralensis is a moth of the family Coleophoridae. It is found in southern France, Spain, Hungary, Croatia, southern Russia, Afghanistan and Iran.

Adults are on wing in late May and June.
