= Phyllonorycter eugregori =

Scientific classification
- Domain: Eukaryota
- Kingdom: Animalia
- Phylum: Arthropoda
- Class: Insecta
- Order: Lepidoptera
- Family: Gracillariidae
- Genus: Phyllonorycter
- Species: P. eugregori

Binomial name
- Phyllonorycter eugregori A. & Z. Lastuvka, 2006

Species of moth

Phyllonorycter eugregori is a moth of the family Gracillariidae. It is known from the Czech Republic, Slovakia, Hungary, Croatia and Montenegro.
