= Stigmella fasciata =

Scientific classification
- Kingdom: Animalia
- Phylum: Arthropoda
- Clade: Pancrustacea
- Class: Insecta
- Order: Lepidoptera
- Family: Nepticulidae
- Genus: Stigmella
- Species: S. fasciata

Binomial name
- Stigmella fasciata van Nieukerken & Johansson, 2003

Species of moth

Stigmella fasciata is a moth of the family Nepticulidae. It is found in Slovenia, Croatia, Greece and Turkey.

The wingspan is 4.3–5 mm. Adults are on wing from June to September.

The larvae feed on Quercus pubescens. They mine the leaves of their host plant.
