= Phyllonorycter cephalariae =

Scientific classification
- Domain: Eukaryota
- Kingdom: Animalia
- Phylum: Arthropoda
- Class: Insecta
- Order: Lepidoptera
- Family: Gracillariidae
- Genus: Phyllonorycter
- Species: P. cephalariae

Binomial name
- Phyllonorycter cephalariae (Lhomme, 1934)

Synonyms
- Lithocolletis cephalariae Lhomme, 1934

Species of moth

Phyllonorycter cephalariae is a moth of the family Gracillariidae. It is known from southern France, Croatia, Greece, Hungary and Serbia.

The larvae feed on Cephalaria leucantha. They mine the leaves of their host plant.
