= Acrobasis bithynella =

Scientific classification
- Kingdom: Animalia
- Phylum: Arthropoda
- Clade: Pancrustacea
- Class: Insecta
- Order: Lepidoptera
- Family: Pyralidae
- Genus: Acrobasis
- Species: A. bithynella

Binomial name
- Acrobasis bithynella Zeller, 1848

Synonyms
- Acrobasis octiptera Schawerda, 1937; Acrobasis plumbeatella Turati, 1913; Acrobasis rubidella Ragonot, 1887; Acrobasis rufella Turati, 1913; Acrobasis turatii Schawerda, 1921; Acrobasis witteella Roesler, 1969; Acrobasis sublutella Turati, 1913; Acrobasis obliterella Staudinger, 1859; Acrobasis minuscula Turati, 1930

Species of moth

Acrobasis bithynella is a species of snout moth in the genus Acrobasis. It was described by Philipp Christoph Zeller in 1848, and is known from France, the Iberian Peninsula, Italy, Croatia, Crete, Turkey and Russia.

The wingspan is about 20 mm.
