= Coleophora thurneri =

Scientific classification
- Kingdom: Animalia
- Phylum: Arthropoda
- Class: Insecta
- Order: Lepidoptera
- Family: Coleophoridae
- Genus: Coleophora
- Species: C. thurneri

Binomial name
- Coleophora thurneri Glaser, 1969

Species of moth

Coleophora thurneri is a moth of the family Coleophoridae. It is found in southern France, Italy and Croatia.

The larvae feed on Artemisia alba. They create a brownish, very thin, tubular silken case of 10–11 mm with a mouth angle of about 45°. Larvae can be found in mid-May.
