= Phyllonorycter amseli =

Scientific classification
- Domain: Eukaryota
- Kingdom: Animalia
- Phylum: Arthropoda
- Class: Insecta
- Order: Lepidoptera
- Family: Gracillariidae
- Genus: Phyllonorycter
- Species: P. amseli

Binomial name
- Phyllonorycter amseli (Povolny & Gregor, 1955)

Synonyms
- Lithocolletis amseli Povolny & Gregor, 1955

Species of moth

Phyllonorycter amseli is a moth of the family Gracillariidae. It is found in Croatia and Montenegro.

The larvae feed on Quercus polycarpa and Quercus pubesecens. They mine the leaves of their host plant.
