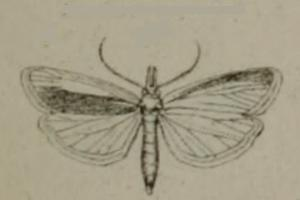
- Hypsotropa ichorella

Scientific classification
- Domain: Eukaryota
- Kingdom: Animalia
- Phylum: Arthropoda
- Class: Insecta
- Order: Lepidoptera
- Family: Pyralidae
- Subfamily: Phycitinae
- Tribe: Anerastiini; Ragonot, 1885

Synonyms
- Hypsotropinae Hampson, 1918; Peoriinae Hulst, 1890; Peoriini

= Anerastiini =

Tribe of moths

The Anerastiini are a tribe of moths of the family Pyralidae.

== Genera ==
- Acritonia Amsel, 1954
- Anacostia J. C. Shaffer, 1968
- Anchylobela Turner, 1947
- Anerastia Hübner, 1825
- Ardekania Amsel, 1951
- Ardekanopsis Amsel, 1954
- Arivaca J. C. Shaffer, 1968
- Asaluria Amsel, 1958
- Atascosa Hulst, 1890
- Baptotropa Hampson, 1918
- Calamotropa Hampson, 1918
- Chortonoeca Hampson, 1918
- Coenotropa Hampson, 1918
- Commotria Berg, 1885
- Comorta Ragonot, 1888
- Dembea Ragonot, 1888
- Discofrontia Hampson in Ragonot, 1901
- Ematheudes Zeller, 1867
- Emmalocera Ragonot, 1888
- Epidauria Rebel, 1901
- Fondoukia Chrétien, 1911
- Fossifrontia Hampson in Ragonot, 1901
- Fregenia Hartig, 1948
- Goya Ragonot, 1888
- Harnochina Dyar, 1914
- Heosphora Meyrick, 1882
- Homosassa Hulst, 1890
- Hosidia Hampson in Ragonot, 1901
- Hypsotropa Zeller, 1848
- Khachia Amsel, 1961
- Laurentia Ragonot, 1888
- Leotropa Hampson, 1918
- Lioprosopa Turner, 1947
- Maliarpha Ragonot, 1888
- Mangala Ragonot, 1888
- Menuthia Ragonot, 1888
- Mesodiphlebia Zeller, 1881
- Monoctenocera Hampson, 1899
- Navasota Ragonot, 1887
- Neorastia Amsel, 1954
- Osakia Ragonot, 1901
- Paratascosa J. C. Shaffer, 1976
- Patna Ragonot, 1888
- Peoria Ragonot, 1887
- Polyocha Zeller, 1848
- Polyochodes Chrétien, 1911
- Postemmalocera Amsel, 1955
- Praerhinaphe Amsel, 1954
- Praesaluria Amsel, 1958
- Prophtasia Ragonot, 1887
- Raphimetopus Hampson, 1918
- Reynosa J. C. Shaffer, 1968
- Saborma Ragonot, 1888
- Saluria Ragonot, 1887
- Seleucia Ragonot, 1887
- Shirazia Amsel, 1954
- Siboga Hampson in Ragonot, 1901
- Sudania Hampson in Ragonot, 1901
- Tiarra Ragonot, 1888
- Tinerastia Hampson in Ragonot, 1901
- Tolima Ragonot, 1888
- Valdovecaria Zerny, 1927
- Villiersoides Marion, 1957
- Zapalla J. C. Shaffer, 1976
