= Tortilia flavella =

Scientific classification
- Kingdom: Animalia
- Phylum: Arthropoda
- Class: Insecta
- Order: Lepidoptera
- Family: Stathmopodidae
- Genus: Tortilia
- Species: T. flavella

Binomial name
- Tortilia flavella Chrétien, 1908

Species of moth

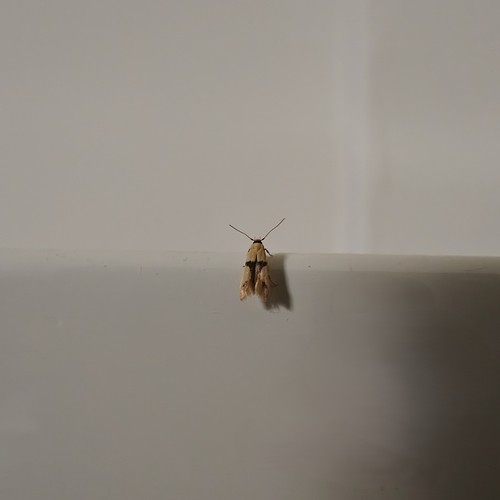

Tortilia flavella is a species of moth in the Stathmopodidae family. It is found in Spain, North Africa, Cyprus and in the Near East (Syria and Israel).

The wingspan is 9–11 mm. Adults have been recorded from May to September. There are probably two generations per year.

Larvae have been recorded on flowers and fruit of Acacia species and on last years dried fruits of Punica granatum.
