= Coleophora seguiella =

Scientific classification
- Kingdom: Animalia
- Phylum: Arthropoda
- Class: Insecta
- Order: Lepidoptera
- Family: Coleophoridae
- Genus: Coleophora
- Species: C. seguiella

Binomial name
- Coleophora seguiella Chrétien, 1915

Synonyms
- Aporiptura leucanthella Capuse, 1974

Species of moth

Coleophora seguiella is a moth of the family Coleophoridae. It is found in Algeria.
