= Polyochodes =

Scientific classification
- Kingdom: Animalia
- Phylum: Arthropoda
- Class: Insecta
- Order: Lepidoptera
- Family: Pyralidae
- Tribe: Anerastiini
- Genus: Polyochodes; Chrétien, 1911
- Species: P. stipella

Binomial name
- Polyochodes stipella Chretien, 1911

Genus of moths

Polyochodes is a monotypic snout moth genus described by Pierre Chrétien in 1911. It contains the single species, described in the same publication, Polyochodes stipella, which is found in Tunisia, Algeria and Spain.

The wingspan is 21–25 mm.
