= Ethmia mixtella =

Scientific classification
- Domain: Eukaryota
- Kingdom: Animalia
- Phylum: Arthropoda
- Class: Insecta
- Order: Lepidoptera
- Family: Depressariidae
- Genus: Ethmia
- Species: E. mixtella

Binomial name
- Ethmia mixtella (Chrétien, 1915)

Synonyms
- Psecadia mixtella Chrétien, 1915

Species of moth

Ethmia mixtella is a moth in the family Depressariidae. It is found in North Africa.
