= Valdovecaria unipunctella =

Scientific classification
- Domain: Eukaryota
- Kingdom: Animalia
- Phylum: Arthropoda
- Class: Insecta
- Order: Lepidoptera
- Family: Pyralidae
- Genus: Valdovecaria
- Species: V. unipunctella

Binomial name
- Valdovecaria unipunctella (Chrétien, 1911)

Synonyms
- Myelois unipunctella Chrétien, 1911; Valdovecaria unipunctella rungsella Leraut, 2002

Species of moth

Valdovecaria unipunctella is a species of snout moth in the genus Valdovecaria. It was described by Pierre Chrétien in 1911. It is found in North Africa, including Algeria and Morocco.
