= Ethmia humiliella =

Scientific classification
- Kingdom: Animalia
- Phylum: Arthropoda
- Class: Insecta
- Order: Lepidoptera
- Family: Depressariidae
- Genus: Ethmia
- Species: E. humiliella

Binomial name
- Ethmia humiliella (Chrétien, 1916)

Synonyms
- Psecadia humiliella Chrétien, 1916

Species of moth

Ethmia humiliella is a moth in the family Depressariidae. It is found in North Africa.
