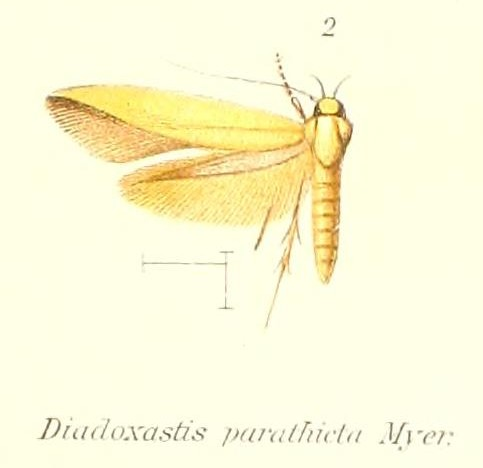
- Tortilia parathicta

Scientific classification
- Domain: Eukaryota
- Kingdom: Animalia
- Phylum: Arthropoda
- Class: Insecta
- Order: Lepidoptera
- Family: Stathmopodidae
- Genus: Tortilia; Chrétien, 1908

Synonyms
- Diadoxastis Meyrick, 1913; Apertodiscus Amsel, 1935

= Tortilia =

Genus of moths

Tortilia is a genus of moths in the Stathmopodidae family.

== Selected species ==
- Tortilia charadritis (Meyrick, 1924) (from Northern Africa to Pakistan)
- Tortilia flavella Chrétien, 1908 (from Algeria)
- Tortilia graeca Kasy, 1981 (from Greece)
- Tortilia hemitorna (Meyrick, 1913) (from India)
- Tortilia pallidella Kasy, 1973 (from Iran)
- Tortilia parathicta (Meyrick, 1913) (from India)
- Tortilia rimulata (Meyrick, 1920) (from East Africa)
- Tortilia sidiota (Meyrick, 1917) (from Pakistan)
- Tortilia trigonella (Zerny, 1935) (from Moroccos)
