= Cosmopterix salahinella =

Scientific classification
- Kingdom: Animalia
- Phylum: Arthropoda
- Class: Insecta
- Order: Lepidoptera
- Family: Cosmopterigidae
- Genus: Cosmopterix
- Species: C. salahinella

Binomial name
- Cosmopterix salahinella Chrétien, 1907

Synonyms
- Cosmopterix rufella Turati, 1927; Cosmopterix phragmitidis Amsel, 1935

Species of moth

Cosmopterix salahinella is a moth of the family Cosmopterigidae. It is found from Tunisia, Egypt, Libya and Israel east to Saudi Arabia and Iran.

The wingspan is 10–12 mm. Adults are on wing from the end of January to the end of May. There are two generations per year in Egypt.

The larvae feed on Phragmites australis and Arundo donax. They mine the leaves of their host plant. Pupation takes place inside of the mine. Larvae can be found from summer to February.
