= Eupithecia rhoisata =

Scientific classification
- Domain: Eukaryota
- Kingdom: Animalia
- Phylum: Arthropoda
- Class: Insecta
- Order: Lepidoptera
- Family: Geometridae
- Genus: Eupithecia
- Species: E. rhoisata

Binomial name
- Eupithecia rhoisata (Chretien, 1917)

Synonyms
- Tephroclystia rhoisata Chretien, 1917

Species of moth

Eupithecia rhoisata is a moth in the family Geometridae. It is found in Libya.
