= Fondoukia =

Scientific classification
- Kingdom: Animalia
- Phylum: Arthropoda
- Class: Insecta
- Order: Lepidoptera
- Family: Pyralidae
- Tribe: Anerastiini
- Genus: Fondoukia; Chrétien, 1911
- Species: F. translucidella

Binomial name
- Fondoukia translucidella Chrétien, 1911

Genus of moths

Fondoukia is a monotypic snout moth genus described by Pierre Chrétien in 1911. Its single species, Fondoukia translucidella, is found in Algeria.
