= Gymnancyla sfakesella =

Scientific classification
- Domain: Eukaryota
- Kingdom: Animalia
- Phylum: Arthropoda
- Class: Insecta
- Order: Lepidoptera
- Family: Pyralidae
- Genus: Gymnancyla
- Species: G. sfakesella

Binomial name
- Gymnancyla sfakesella Chrétien, 1911

Synonyms
- Ilithyia merkalana D. Lucas, 1937; Nefertitia candida Gozmány, 1960

Species of moth

Gymnancyla sfakesella is a species of snout moth in the genus Gymnancyla. It was described by Pierre Chrétien in 1911 and is known from Spain, Algeria, Morocco, and Egypt.

The wingspan is 13.5-16.5 mm.
