= Scythris canescens =

Scientific classification
- Kingdom: Animalia
- Phylum: Arthropoda
- Class: Insecta
- Order: Lepidoptera
- Family: Scythrididae
- Genus: Scythris
- Species: S. canescens

Binomial name
- Scythris canescens (Staudinger, 1880)

Synonyms
- Butalis canescens Staudinger, 1880; Scythris plumbeogrisea Walsingham, 1907; Scythris articulatella var. maculatella Chrétien, 1915

Species of moth

Scythris canescens is a moth of the family Scythrididae. It was described by Staudinger in 1880. It is found in Morocco, Algeria, Tunisia, Libya, Turkey, Syria, Iran, Afghanistan and Pakistan.
