= Anacostia (disambiguation) =

Anacostia is a historic neighborhood in Washington, D.C.

Anacostia may also refer to:

== Places ==
- Anacostia Historic District, the historic district which encompasses the Anacostia neighborhood
  - Anacostia station, a Washington Metro station in this neighborhood
  - Naval Support Facility Anacostia, a formerly independent US Naval Base in this neighborhood, now part of the Joint Base Anacostia–Bolling
- Anacostia River, a river in the Mid Atlantic region of the US

== Other ==
- Anacostia (web series), a soap opera web series set in the Washington, D.C. neighborhood
- Anacostia (moth), a genus of snout moths
- USS Anacostia (1856), a US Navy steamer
- USS Anacostia (AO-94), a US Navy replenishment oiler
- 980 Anacostia, a minor planet orbiting the Sun
- Anacostia (band), U.S. soul band, previously recorded as The Presidents

== See also ==
- District of Columbia Route 295, also called the Anacostia Freeway
