= Seleucia pectinella =

Scientific classification
- Kingdom: Animalia
- Phylum: Arthropoda
- Class: Insecta
- Order: Lepidoptera
- Family: Pyralidae
- Genus: Seleucia
- Species: S. pectinella

Binomial name
- Seleucia pectinella (Chretien, 1911)

Synonyms
- Speiroceras pectinella Chretien, 1911; Seleucia pectinellum; Anerastia bicolor Turati, 1931; Hypsotropa biscrensis Hampson, 1918

Species of moth

Seleucia pectinella is a species of snout moth in the genus Seleucia. It was described by Pierre Chrétien in 1911, and is known from Algeria, Croatia, Albania, Sicily, Crete and mainland Greece.

The wingspan is about 25 mm.
