= Scythris formicella =

Scientific classification
- Kingdom: Animalia
- Phylum: Arthropoda
- Class: Insecta
- Order: Lepidoptera
- Family: Scythrididae
- Genus: Scythris
- Species: S. formicella

Binomial name
- Scythris formicella Chrétien, 1915

Species of moth

Scythris formicella is a moth of the family Scythrididae. It was described by Pierre Chrétien in 1915. It is found in Algeria.

The larvae have been recorded feeding on Herniaria fruticosa.
