= Elachista bromella =

Scientific classification
- Domain: Eukaryota
- Kingdom: Animalia
- Phylum: Arthropoda
- Class: Insecta
- Order: Lepidoptera
- Family: Elachistidae
- Genus: Elachista
- Species: E. bromella

Binomial name
- Elachista bromella Chrétien, 1915

Species of moth

Elachista bromella is a moth in the family Elachistidae. It was described by Pierre Chrétien in 1915. It is found in Algeria.
