= Elachista zabella =

Scientific classification
- Domain: Eukaryota
- Kingdom: Animalia
- Phylum: Arthropoda
- Class: Insecta
- Order: Lepidoptera
- Family: Elachistidae
- Genus: Elachista
- Species: E. zabella

Binomial name
- Elachista zabella Chrétien, 1908

Species of moth

Elachista zabella is a moth in the family Elachistidae. It was described by Pierre Chrétien in 1908. It is found in Algeria.
