= Scythris barbatella =

Scientific classification
- Kingdom: Animalia
- Phylum: Arthropoda
- Class: Insecta
- Order: Lepidoptera
- Family: Scythrididae
- Genus: Scythris
- Species: S. barbatella

Binomial name
- Scythris barbatella Chrétien, 1915

Species of moth

Scythris barbatella is a moth of the family Scythrididae. It was described by Pierre Chrétien in 1915. It is found in Algeria and Tunisia.
