= Epidauria subcostella =

Scientific classification
- Kingdom: Animalia
- Phylum: Arthropoda
- Class: Insecta
- Order: Lepidoptera
- Family: Pyralidae
- Genus: Epidauria
- Species: E. subcostella

Binomial name
- Epidauria subcostella Hampson, 1918

Species of moth

Epidauria subcostella is a species of snout moth in the genus Epidauria. It was described by George Hampson in 1918. It is found in Yunnan, China.
