= Tortilia parathicta =

Scientific classification
- Kingdom: Animalia
- Phylum: Arthropoda
- Class: Insecta
- Order: Lepidoptera
- Family: Stathmopodidae
- Genus: Tortilia
- Species: T. parathicta

Binomial name
- Tortilia parathicta (Meyrick, 1913)

Synonyms
- Diadoxastis parathicta Meyrick, 1913

Species of moth

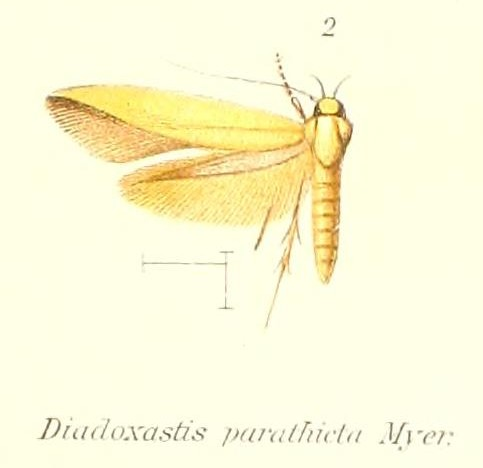
Tortilia parathicta

Tortilia parathicta is a species of moth in the Stathmopodidae family. It is found in India.
