= Comorta =

Scientific classification
- Kingdom: Animalia
- Phylum: Arthropoda
- Class: Insecta
- Order: Lepidoptera
- Family: Pyralidae
- Tribe: Anerastiini
- Genus: Comorta; Ragonot, 1888

Genus of moths

Comorta is a genus of moths of the family Pyralidae.

== Species ==
- Comorta plinthina (Turner, 1905)
- Comorta zophopleura (Turner, 1904)
