= Hypsotropa sabuletella =

Scientific classification
- Kingdom: Animalia
- Phylum: Arthropoda
- Clade: Pancrustacea
- Class: Insecta
- Order: Lepidoptera
- Family: Pyralidae
- Genus: Hypsotropa
- Species: H. sabuletella

Binomial name
- Hypsotropa sabuletella (Zeller, 1852)

Synonyms
- Anerastia sabuletella Zeller, 1852

Species of moth

Hypsotropa sabuletella is a species of snout moth in the genus Hypsotropa. It was described by Zeller in 1852, and is known from South Africa.
