= Laurentia albivenella =

Scientific classification
- Domain: Eukaryota
- Kingdom: Animalia
- Phylum: Arthropoda
- Class: Insecta
- Order: Lepidoptera
- Family: Pyralidae
- Genus: Laurentia
- Species: L. albivenella

Binomial name
- Laurentia albivenella Hampson, 1918

Species of moth

Laurentia albivenella is a species of snout moth. It was described by George Hampson in 1918. It is found in Taiwan.
