= Fossifrontia =

Scientific classification
- Kingdom: Animalia
- Phylum: Arthropoda
- Class: Insecta
- Order: Lepidoptera
- Family: Pyralidae
- Tribe: Anerastiini
- Genus: Fossifrontia; Hampson in Ragonot, 1891
- Species: F. leuconeurella

Binomial name
- Fossifrontia leuconeurella Hampson, 1901

Genus of moths

Fossifrontia is a monotypic snout moth genus described by George Hampson in 1891. Its single species, Fossifrontia leuconeurella, is found in Queensland, Australia.
