= Neorastia =

Scientific classification
- Kingdom: Animalia
- Phylum: Arthropoda
- Class: Insecta
- Order: Lepidoptera
- Family: Pyralidae
- Tribe: Anerastiini
- Genus: Neorastia; Amsel, 1954
- Species: N. albicostella

Binomial name
- Neorastia albicostella Amsel, 1954

Genus of moths

Neorastia is a monotypic snout moth genus described by Hans Georg Amsel in 1954. Its only species, described in the same publication, Neorastia albicostella, is known from Iran (including Bender Tchahbahar, the type location).
