= Epidauria (moth) =

Scientific classification
- Kingdom: Animalia
- Phylum: Arthropoda
- Class: Insecta
- Order: Lepidoptera
- Family: Pyralidae
- Tribe: Anerastiini
- Genus: Epidauria; Rebel, 1901

Synonyms
- Epidauria Ragonot, 1901

Genus of moths

Epidauria is a genus of snout moths. It was described by Hans Rebel in 1901.

== Species ==
- Epidauria cantonella Shibuya, 1931
- Epidauria chionocraspis Hampson, 1918
- Epidauria fulvella (Kuznetzov, 1978)
- Epidauria strigosa Staudinger, 1879
- Epidauria subcostella Hampson, 1918
- Epidauria transversariella Zeller, 1848
