= Hypsotropa rhodochroella =

Scientific classification
- Domain: Eukaryota
- Kingdom: Animalia
- Phylum: Arthropoda
- Class: Insecta
- Order: Lepidoptera
- Family: Pyralidae
- Genus: Hypsotropa
- Species: H. rhodochroella

Binomial name
- Hypsotropa rhodochroella Hampson, 1918

Species of moth

Hypsotropa rhodochroella is a species of snout moth in the genus Hypsotropa. It was described by George Hampson in 1918 and is known from Uganda and South Africa.
