= Arivaca poohella =

Scientific classification
- Domain: Eukaryota
- Kingdom: Animalia
- Phylum: Arthropoda
- Class: Insecta
- Order: Lepidoptera
- Family: Pyralidae
- Genus: Arivaca
- Species: A. poohella

Binomial name
- Arivaca poohella J. C. Shaffer, 1968

Species of moth

Arivaca poohella is a species of snout moth described by Jay C. Shaffer in 1968. It is found in the US from southern Arizona through New Mexico to Texas.
