= Postemmalocera =

Scientific classification
- Kingdom: Animalia
- Phylum: Arthropoda
- Class: Insecta
- Order: Lepidoptera
- Family: Pyralidae
- Tribe: Anerastiini
- Genus: Postemmalocera; Amsel, 1955
- Species: P. palaearctella

Binomial name
- Postemmalocera palaearctella (Turati, 1917)

Synonyms
- Emmalocera palaearctella Turati, 1917

Genus of moths

Postemmalocera is a monotypic snout moth genus described by Hans Georg Amsel in 1955. Its only species, Postemmalocera palaearctella, described by E. Turati, is found in Italy and on Sicily and Malta.

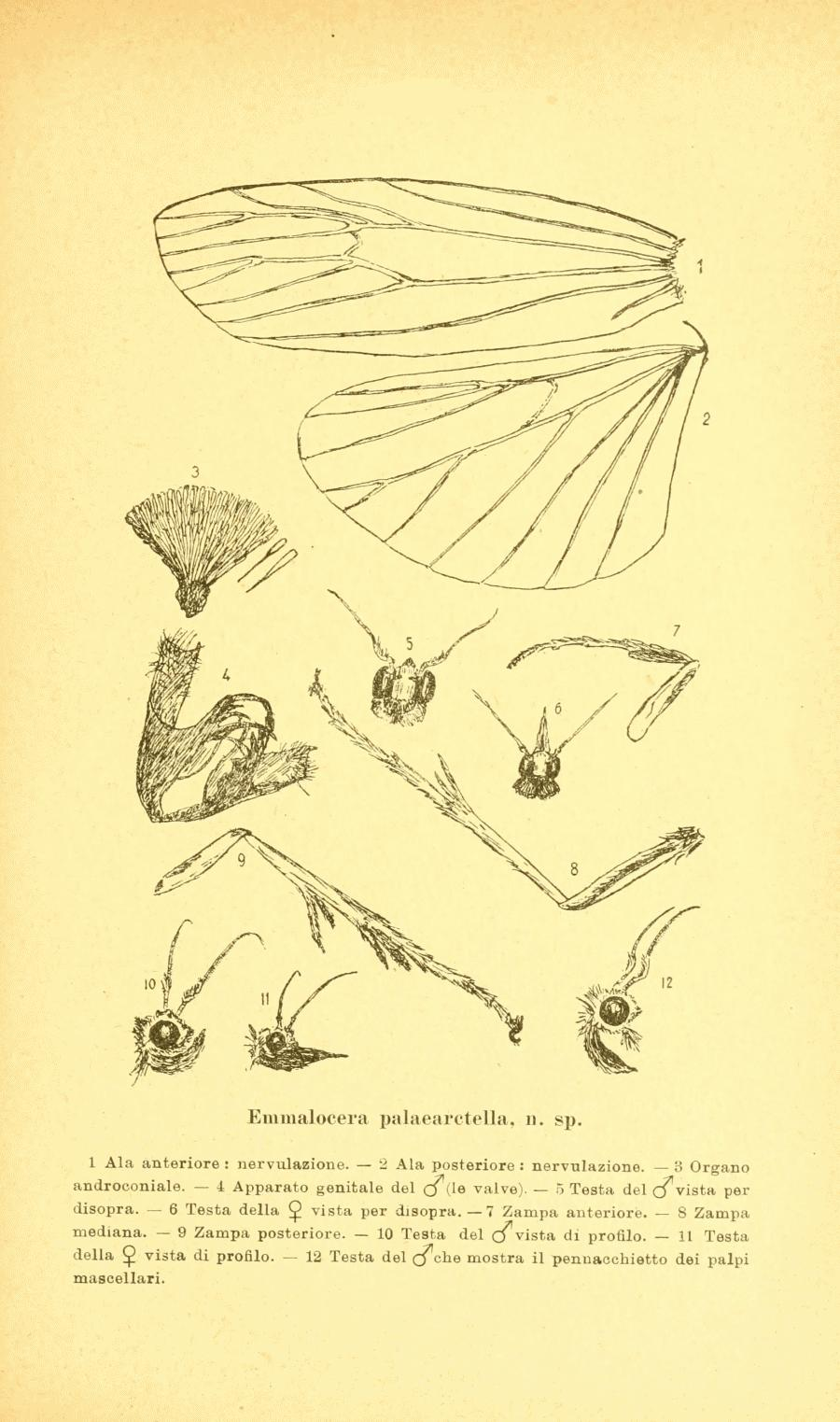
Illustrations accompanying original description
