= Anchylobela =

Scientific classification
- Kingdom: Animalia
- Phylum: Arthropoda
- Class: Insecta
- Order: Lepidoptera
- Family: Pyralidae
- Tribe: Anerastiini
- Genus: Anchylobela; Turner, 1947

Genus of moths

Anchylobela is a genus of snout moths. It was described by Alfred Jefferis Turner in 1947.

== Species ==
- Anchylobela acidnias (Turner, 1904)
- Anchylobela dyseimata (Turner, 1913)
- Anchylobela haplodes Turner, 1947
- Anchylobela holophaea (Turner, 1905)
- Anchylobela nitens (Butler, 1886)
- Anchylobela phaulodes (Turner, 1947)
