= Hypsotropa endorhoda =

Scientific classification
- Kingdom: Animalia
- Phylum: Arthropoda
- Class: Insecta
- Order: Lepidoptera
- Family: Pyralidae
- Genus: Hypsotropa
- Species: H. endorhoda

Binomial name
- Hypsotropa endorhoda Hampson, 1918

Species of moth

Hypsotropa endorhoda is a species of snout moth in the genus Hypsotropa. It was described by George Hampson in 1918 and is known from Zimbabwe.
