= Hypsotropa pusillella =

Scientific classification
- Domain: Eukaryota
- Kingdom: Animalia
- Phylum: Arthropoda
- Class: Insecta
- Order: Lepidoptera
- Family: Pyralidae
- Genus: Hypsotropa
- Species: H. pusillella

Binomial name
- Hypsotropa pusillella Ragonot, 1888

Species of moth

Hypsotropa pusillella is a species of snout moth in the genus Hypsotropa. It was described by Ragonot in 1888, and is known from Zanzibar.
