= Anchylobela haplodes =

Scientific classification
- Kingdom: Animalia
- Phylum: Arthropoda
- Class: Insecta
- Order: Lepidoptera
- Family: Pyralidae
- Genus: Anchylobela
- Species: A. haplodes

Binomial name
- Anchylobela haplodes Turner, 1947

Species of moth

Anchylobela haplodes is a species of snout moth described by Alfred Jefferis Turner in 1947. It is known from Queensland, Australia.
