= Fregenia =

Scientific classification
- Kingdom: Animalia
- Phylum: Arthropoda
- Clade: Pancrustacea
- Class: Insecta
- Order: Lepidoptera
- Family: Pyralidae
- Tribe: Anerastiini
- Genus: Fregenia; Hartig, 1947
- Species: F. prolai

Binomial name
- Fregenia prolai Hartig, 1947

Genus of moths

Fregenia is a monotypic snout moth genus described by Friedrich Hartig in 1948. Its only member, Fregenia prolai, is found in Italy. The type locality is Fregene.
