= Anerastia infumella =

Scientific classification
- Domain: Eukaryota
- Kingdom: Animalia
- Phylum: Arthropoda
- Class: Insecta
- Order: Lepidoptera
- Family: Pyralidae
- Genus: Anerastia
- Species: A. infumella

Binomial name
- Anerastia infumella Ragonot, 1887

Species of moth

Anerastia infumella is a species of snout moth in the genus Anerastia. It was described by Émile Louis Ragonot in 1887, and is known from Iran.

The wingspan is about 19 mm.
