= Raphimetopus incarnatella =

Scientific classification
- Kingdom: Animalia
- Phylum: Arthropoda
- Class: Insecta
- Order: Lepidoptera
- Family: Pyralidae
- Genus: Raphimetopus
- Species: R. incarnatella

Binomial name
- Raphimetopus incarnatella (Ragonot, 1887)

Synonyms
- Anerastia incarnatella Ragonot, 1887

Species of moth

Raphimetopus incarnatella is a species of snout moth. It is found in Russia.

The wingspan is about 20 mm.
