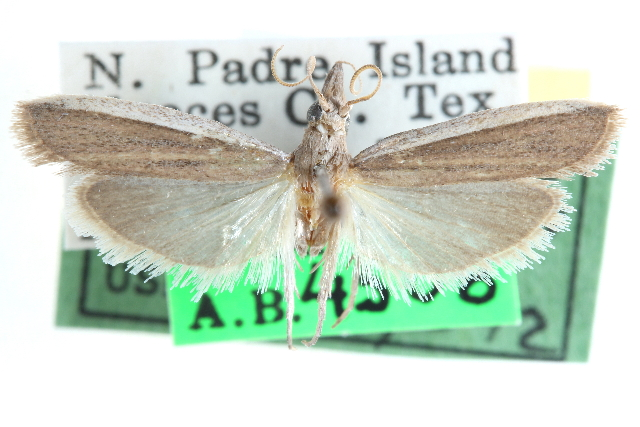

Scientific classification
- Domain: Eukaryota
- Kingdom: Animalia
- Phylum: Arthropoda
- Class: Insecta
- Order: Lepidoptera
- Family: Pyralidae
- Genus: Arivaca
- Species: A. albicostella

Binomial name
- Arivaca albicostella (Grossbeck, 1917)

Synonyms
- Calera albicostella Grossbeck, 1917

= Arivaca albicostella =

Species of moth

Arivaca albicostella is a species of snout moth. It is found in the US in southern Florida.

The forewings are reddish brown, often sprinkled with light brown and dark brown scales. The color is light brown anterior to the cell, sometimes sprinkled rather heavily with darker scales. The hindwings are light brown.
