= Raphimetopus nitidicostella =

Scientific classification
- Domain: Eukaryota
- Kingdom: Animalia
- Phylum: Arthropoda
- Class: Insecta
- Order: Lepidoptera
- Family: Pyralidae
- Genus: Raphimetopus
- Species: R. nitidicostella

Binomial name
- Raphimetopus nitidicostella (Ragonot, 1887)

Synonyms
- Anerastia nitidicostella Ragonot, 1887

Species of moth

Raphimetopus nitidicostella is a species of snout moth. It is found in Russia.

The wingspan is about 18 mm.
