= Hypsotropa graptophlebia =

Scientific classification
- Kingdom: Animalia
- Phylum: Arthropoda
- Class: Insecta
- Order: Lepidoptera
- Family: Pyralidae
- Genus: Hypsotropa
- Species: H. graptophlebia

Binomial name
- Hypsotropa graptophlebia Hampson, 1918

Species of moth

Hypsotropa graptophlebia is a species of snout moth in the genus Hypsotropa. It was described by George Hampson in 1918 and is known from Mashonaland in Zimbabwe and South Africa.
