= Valdovecaria bradyrrhoella =

Scientific classification
- Domain: Eukaryota
- Kingdom: Animalia
- Phylum: Arthropoda
- Class: Insecta
- Order: Lepidoptera
- Family: Pyralidae
- Genus: Valdovecaria
- Species: V. bradyrrhoella

Binomial name
- Valdovecaria bradyrrhoella Zerny, 1927

Synonyms
- Bradyrrhoa fassnidgei Lhomme, 1945

Species of moth

Valdovecaria bradyrrhoella is a species of snout moth in the genus Valdovecaria. It was described by Zerny in 1927. It is found in Spain and France.
