= Saluria maculivittella =

Scientific classification
- Domain: Eukaryota
- Kingdom: Animalia
- Phylum: Arthropoda
- Class: Insecta
- Order: Lepidoptera
- Family: Pyralidae
- Genus: Saluria
- Species: S. maculivittella

Binomial name
- Saluria maculivittella Ragonot, 1887

Synonyms
- Saluria armeniella Ragonot, 1888

Species of moth

Saluria maculivittella is a species of snout moth. It is found in France and on Sardinia, as well as in Tunisia, the Caucasus and Turkey.

The wingspan is about 25 mm.
