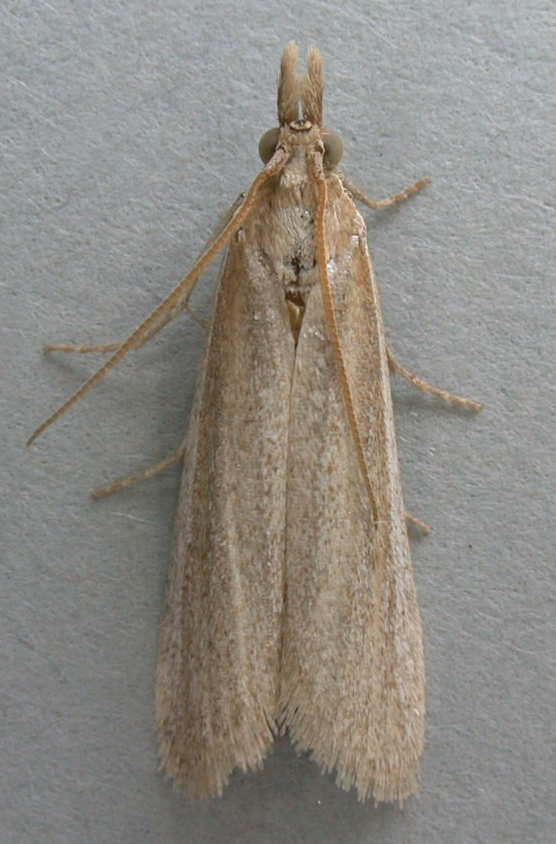

Scientific classification
- Kingdom: Animalia
- Phylum: Arthropoda
- Clade: Pancrustacea
- Class: Insecta
- Order: Lepidoptera
- Family: Pyralidae
- Genus: Anerastia
- Species: A. lotella

Binomial name
- Anerastia lotella (Hübner, 1813)

Synonyms
- Tinea lotella Hübner, 1813; Tinea miniosella Zincken, 1818

= Anerastia lotella =

Species of moth

Anerastia lotella is a species of snout moth in the genus Anerastia. It was described by Jacob Hübner in 1813. It is found in most of Europe, western Russia, Asia Minor, Iran and western Turkestan. It has also been recorded from most of Canada.

The wingspan is 19–27 mm. Adults are on wing in July.

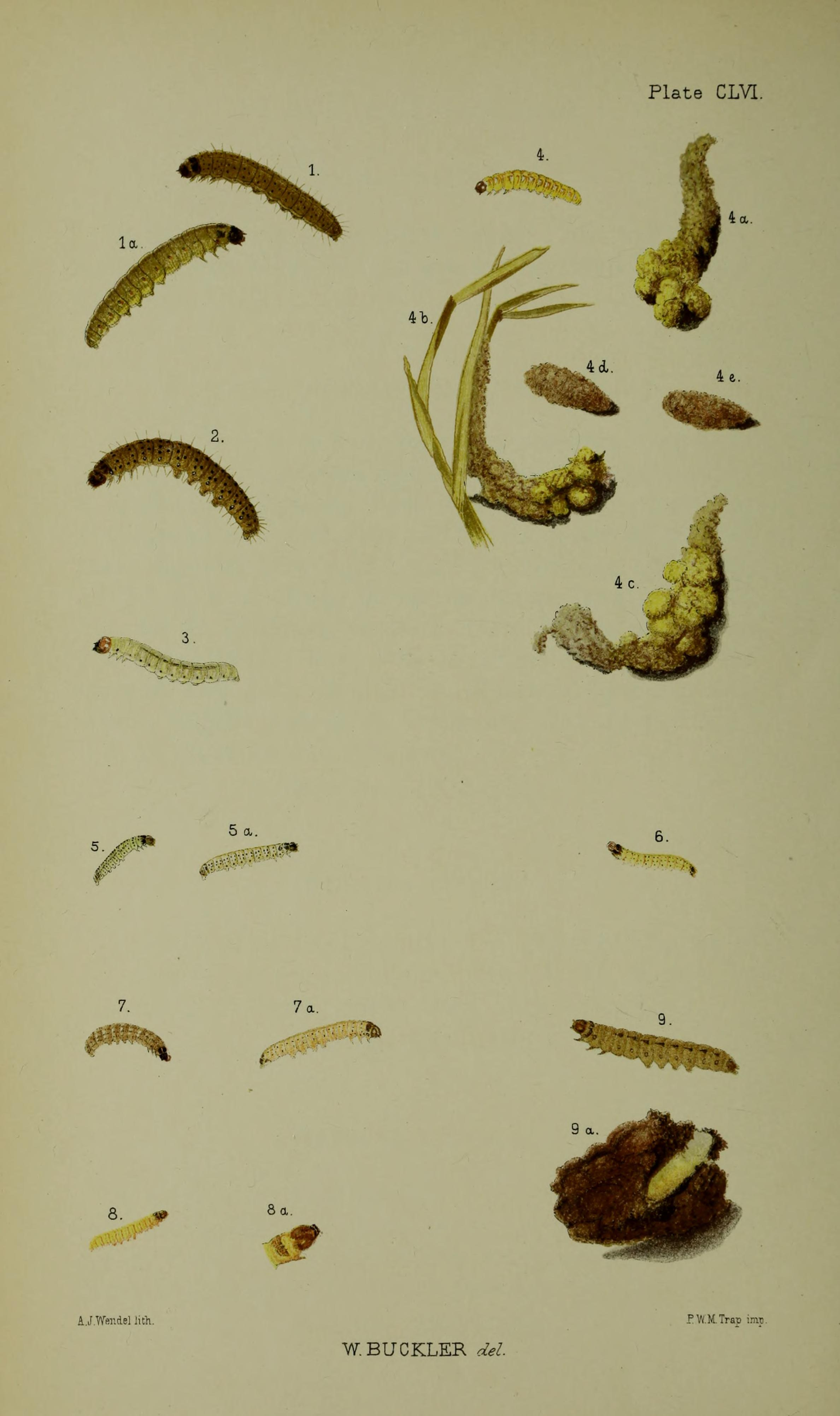
Figs.4larva after final moult 4a, 4b, 4c, 4d, 4e larval cases and cocoons

The larvae feed on various Poaceae species, including Ammophila arenaria, Corynephorus canescens and Festuca ovina.
