= Tortilia hemitorna =

Scientific classification
- Kingdom: Animalia
- Phylum: Arthropoda
- Class: Insecta
- Order: Lepidoptera
- Family: Stathmopodidae
- Genus: Tortilia
- Species: T. hemitorna

Binomial name
- Tortilia hemitorna (Meyrick, 1913)

Synonyms
- Stathmopoda hemitorna Meyrick, 1917

Species of moth

Tortilia hemitorna is a species of moth in the Stathmopodidae family. It is found in India.
