= Anchylobela acidnias =

Scientific classification
- Kingdom: Animalia
- Phylum: Arthropoda
- Class: Insecta
- Order: Lepidoptera
- Family: Pyralidae
- Genus: Anchylobela
- Species: A. acidnias

Binomial name
- Anchylobela acidnias (Turner, 1904)

Synonyms
- Hypsotropha acidnias Turner, 1904

Species of moth

Anchylobela acidnias is a species of snout moth in the genus Anchylobela. It was described by Alfred Jefferis Turner in 1904, and is known from Australia.
