= Ardekania sefidella =

Scientific classification
- Kingdom: Animalia
- Phylum: Arthropoda
- Class: Insecta
- Order: Lepidoptera
- Family: Pyralidae
- Genus: Ardekania
- Species: A. sefidella

Binomial name
- Ardekania sefidella Amsel, 1954

Species of moth

Ardekania sefidella is a species of snout moth in the genus Ardekania. It was described by Hans Georg Amsel in 1954 and is known from Iran.
