= Laurentia (moth) =

Scientific classification
- Domain: Eukaryota
- Kingdom: Animalia
- Phylum: Arthropoda
- Class: Insecta
- Order: Lepidoptera
- Family: Pyralidae
- Subfamily: Phycitinae
- Tribe: Anerastiini
- Genus: Laurentia; Ragonot, 1888

Genus of moths

Laurentia is a genus of snout moths described by Émile Louis Ragonot in 1888.

== Species ==
- Laurentia albivenella Hampson, 1918
- Laurentia inclarella Ragonot, 1888
