= Calamotropa =

Scientific classification
- Kingdom: Animalia
- Phylum: Arthropoda
- Class: Insecta
- Order: Lepidoptera
- Family: Pyralidae
- Tribe: Anerastiini
- Genus: Calamotropa; Hampson, 1918
- Species: C. pulverivena

Binomial name
- Calamotropa pulverivena Hampson, 1918

Synonyms
- Calamotropha Turner, 1947

Genus of moths

Calamotropa is a genus of snout moths. It was described by George Hampson in 1918 and contains the species Calamotropa pulverivena. It is found in Western Australia.
