= Hypsotropa roseotincta =

Scientific classification
- Domain: Eukaryota
- Kingdom: Animalia
- Phylum: Arthropoda
- Class: Insecta
- Order: Lepidoptera
- Family: Pyralidae
- Genus: Hypsotropa
- Species: H. roseotincta

Binomial name
- Hypsotropa roseotincta Janse, 1922

Species of moth

Hypsotropa roseotincta is a species of snout moth in the genus Hypsotropa. It was described by Anthonie Johannes Theodorus Janse in 1922 and is known from South Africa.
