= Hypsotropa diaphaea =

Scientific classification
- Kingdom: Animalia
- Phylum: Arthropoda
- Clade: Pancrustacea
- Class: Insecta
- Order: Lepidoptera
- Family: Pyralidae
- Genus: Hypsotropa
- Species: H. diaphaea

Binomial name
- Hypsotropa diaphaea Hampson, 1918

Species of moth

Hypsotropa diaphaea is a species of snout moth in the genus Hypsotropa. It was described by George Hampson in 1918 and is known from Malawi. The species occurs in tropical Africa.
