= Osakia =

Scientific classification
- Kingdom: Animalia
- Phylum: Arthropoda
- Class: Insecta
- Order: Lepidoptera
- Family: Pyralidae
- Tribe: Anerastiini
- Genus: Osakia; Ragonot, 1901
- Species: O. lineolella

Binomial name
- Osakia lineolella Ragonot, 1901

Synonyms
- Osacia Hampson, 1918

Genus of moths

Osakia is a monotypic snout moth genus described Émile Louis Ragonot in 1901. Its only species, described in the same publication, Osakia lineolella, is known from Japan.
