= Monoctenocera brachiella =

Scientific classification
- Kingdom: Animalia
- Phylum: Arthropoda
- Class: Insecta
- Order: Lepidoptera
- Family: Pyralidae
- Genus: Monoctenocera
- Species: M. brachiella

Binomial name
- Monoctenocera brachiella Hampson in Ragonot, 1898

Species of moth

Monoctenocera brachiella is a species of snout moth, and the type species in the genus Monoctenocera. It was described by George Hampson in 1898 and is known from India (including Sikkim and Kolkata).
