= Arivaca linella =

Scientific classification
- Domain: Eukaryota
- Kingdom: Animalia
- Phylum: Arthropoda
- Class: Insecta
- Order: Lepidoptera
- Family: Pyralidae
- Genus: Arivaca
- Species: A. linella

Binomial name
- Arivaca linella Shaffer, 1968

Species of moth

Arivaca linella is a species of snout moth described by Jay C. Shaffer in 1968. It is found in the US states of Arizona and New Mexico.

The forewings are brown anterior to cell.
