= Anerastia dubia =

Scientific classification
- Kingdom: Animalia
- Phylum: Arthropoda
- Class: Insecta
- Order: Lepidoptera
- Family: Pyralidae
- Genus: Anerastia
- Species: A. dubia

Binomial name
- Anerastia dubia Gerasimov, 1929

Species of moth

Anerastia dubia is a species of snout moth in the genus Anerastia. It was described by Aleksey Maksimovich Gerasimov in 1929. It is found in Hungary.
