= Mesodiphlebia =

Scientific classification
- Kingdom: Animalia
- Phylum: Arthropoda
- Clade: Pancrustacea
- Class: Insecta
- Order: Lepidoptera
- Family: Pyralidae
- Tribe: Anerastiini
- Genus: Mesodiphlebia; Zeller, 1881

Synonyms
- Schenectadia Dyar, 1914

Genus of moths

Mesodiphlebia is a genus of snout moths described by Philipp Christoph Zeller in 1881.

== Species ==
- Mesodiphlebia crassivenia Zeller, 1881
- Mesodiphlebia ochraceella Hampson, 1918
- Mesodiphlebia stricticostella Ragonot, 1887
