= Raphimetopus spinifrontella =

Scientific classification
- Domain: Eukaryota
- Kingdom: Animalia
- Phylum: Arthropoda
- Class: Insecta
- Order: Lepidoptera
- Family: Pyralidae
- Genus: Raphimetopus
- Species: R. spinifrontella

Binomial name
- Raphimetopus spinifrontella (Ragonot, 1888)

Synonyms
- Anerastia spinifrontella Ragonot, 1888

Species of moth

Raphimetopus spinifrontella is a species of snout moth. It is found in India.
