= Lioprosopa =

Scientific classification
- Kingdom: Animalia
- Phylum: Arthropoda
- Class: Insecta
- Order: Lepidoptera
- Family: Pyralidae
- Tribe: Anerastiini
- Genus: Lioprosopa; Turner, 1947

Genus of moths

Lioprosopa is a genus of snout moths. It was described by Alfred Jefferis Turner in 1947.

== Species ==
- Lioprosopa adenocera (Turner, 1923)
- Lioprosopa albivena (Turner, 1947)
- Lioprosopa amictodes (Turner, 1947)
- Lioprosopa argosticha (Turner, 1913)
- Lioprosopa haploa Turner, 1947
- Lioprosopa microrrhoda (Turner, 1923)
- Lioprosopa neuricella (Hampson, 1918)
- Lioprosopa poliosticha Turner, 1947
- Lioprosopa rhadinodes Turner, 1947
- Lioprosopa rhantista Turner, 1947
- Lioprosopa rhodobaphella (Ragonot, 1888)
- Lioprosopa rhodosticha (Turner, 1904)
