= Hypsotropa adumbratella =

Scientific classification
- Kingdom: Animalia
- Phylum: Arthropoda
- Clade: Pancrustacea
- Class: Insecta
- Order: Lepidoptera
- Family: Pyralidae
- Genus: Hypsotropa
- Species: H. adumbratella

Binomial name
- Hypsotropa adumbratella Ragonot, 1888

Species of moth

Hypsotropa adumbratella is a species of snout moth in the genus Hypsotropa. It was described by Ragonot in 1888, and is known from South Africa.
