= Ardekania =

Scientific classification
- Kingdom: Animalia
- Phylum: Arthropoda
- Class: Insecta
- Order: Lepidoptera
- Family: Pyralidae
- Tribe: Anerastiini
- Genus: Ardekania; Amsel, 1951

Genus of moths

Ardekania is a genus of snout moths. It was described by Hans Georg Amsel in 1951 and is known from Iran.

== Species ==
- Ardekania albidiscella Amsel, 1954
- Ardekania farsella Amsel, 1951
- Ardekania sefidella Amsel, 1954
