= Raphimetopus =

Scientific classification
- Kingdom: Animalia
- Phylum: Arthropoda
- Class: Insecta
- Order: Lepidoptera
- Family: Pyralidae
- Tribe: Anerastiini
- Genus: Raphimetopus; Hampson, 1918

Genus of moths

Raphimetopus is a genus of snout moths. It was described by George Hampson in 1918.

== Species ==
- Raphimetopus ablutella (Zeller, 1839)
- Raphimetopus incarnatella Ragonot, 1887
- Raphimetopus nitidicostella Ragonot, 1887
- Raphimetopus spinifrontella Ragonot, 1888
