= Anchylobela holophaea =

Scientific classification
- Kingdom: Animalia
- Phylum: Arthropoda
- Class: Insecta
- Order: Lepidoptera
- Family: Pyralidae
- Genus: Anchylobela
- Species: A. holophaea

Binomial name
- Anchylobela holophaea (Turner, 1905)

Synonyms
- Ampycophora holophaea Turner, 1905

Species of moth

Anchylobela holophaea is a species of snout moth in the genus Anchylobela. It was described by Alfred Jefferis Turner in 1905, and is known from northern Australia.
