= Lioprosopa adenocera =

Scientific classification
- Kingdom: Animalia
- Phylum: Arthropoda
- Class: Insecta
- Order: Lepidoptera
- Family: Pyralidae
- Genus: Lioprosopa
- Species: L. adenocera

Binomial name
- Lioprosopa adenocera (Turner, 1923)

Synonyms
- Saluria adenocera Turner, 1923

Species of moth

Lioprosopa adenocera is a species of snout moth in the genus Lioprosopa. It was originally described by Turner in 1923, as a species of Lioprosopa. It is known from Australia.
