= Harnochina =

Scientific classification
- Kingdom: Animalia
- Phylum: Arthropoda
- Class: Insecta
- Order: Lepidoptera
- Family: Pyralidae
- Tribe: Anerastiini
- Genus: Harnochina; Dyar, 1914
- Species: H. rectilinea

Binomial name
- Harnochina rectilinea Dyar, 1914

Genus of moths

Harnochina is a monotypic snout moth genus described by Harrison Gray Dyar Jr. in 1914. Its single species, Harnochina rectilinea, is found in Panama.
