= Seleucia semirosella =

Scientific classification
- Kingdom: Animalia
- Phylum: Arthropoda
- Clade: Pancrustacea
- Class: Insecta
- Order: Lepidoptera
- Family: Pyralidae
- Genus: Seleucia
- Species: S. semirosella

Binomial name
- Seleucia semirosella Ragonot, 1887

Species of moth

Seleucia semirosella is a species of snout moth. It is found in Croatia and Greece.

The wingspan is about 20 mm.
