= Khachia =

Scientific classification
- Kingdom: Animalia
- Phylum: Arthropoda
- Class: Insecta
- Order: Lepidoptera
- Family: Pyralidae
- Tribe: Anerastiini
- Genus: Khachia; Amsel, 1961
- Species: K. albicostella

Binomial name
- Khachia albicostella Amsel, 1961

Genus of moths

Khachia is a monotypic snout moth genus described by Hans Georg Amsel in 1961. Its only species, Khachia albicostella, is known from Iran.
