= Valdovecaria umbratella =

Scientific classification
- Domain: Eukaryota
- Kingdom: Animalia
- Phylum: Arthropoda
- Class: Insecta
- Order: Lepidoptera
- Family: Pyralidae
- Genus: Valdovecaria
- Species: V. umbratella

Binomial name
- Valdovecaria umbratella (Treitschke, 1832)

Synonyms
- Galleria umbratella Treitschke, 1832

Species of moth

Valdovecaria umbratella is a species of snout moth in the genus Valdovecaria. It was described by Treitschke in 1832. It is found in France, Croatia, Turkey and on Sicily.
