= Gymnancyla craticulella =

Scientific classification
- Kingdom: Animalia
- Phylum: Arthropoda
- Clade: Pancrustacea
- Class: Insecta
- Order: Lepidoptera
- Family: Pyralidae
- Genus: Gymnancyla
- Species: G. craticulella

Binomial name
- Gymnancyla craticulella (Ragonot, 1887)

Synonyms
- Dentinodia craticulella Ragonot, 1887; Ancylosis erschoffi Ragonot, 1887

Species of moth

Gymnancyla craticulella is a species of snout moth in the genus Gymnancyla. It was described by Ragonot in 1887, and is known from Russia, Kyrgyzstan and Uzbekistan.

The wingspan is about 25 mm.
