= Epidauria cantonella =

Scientific classification
- Kingdom: Animalia
- Phylum: Arthropoda
- Class: Insecta
- Order: Lepidoptera
- Family: Pyralidae
- Genus: Epidauria
- Species: E. cantonella

Binomial name
- Epidauria cantonella Shibuya, 1931

Species of moth

Epidauria cantonella is a species of snout moth in the genus Epidauria. It was described by Shibuya in 1931, and is known from China.
