= Lioprosopa argosticha =

Scientific classification
- Kingdom: Animalia
- Phylum: Arthropoda
- Class: Insecta
- Order: Lepidoptera
- Family: Pyralidae
- Genus: Lioprosopa
- Species: L. argosticha

Binomial name
- Lioprosopa argosticha (Turner, 1914)

Synonyms
- Anerastria argosticha Turner, 1913

Species of moth

Lioprosopa argosticha is a species of snout moth in the genus Lioprosopa. It was described by Turner in 1913, and is known from Australia.
