= Hypsotropa makulanella =

Scientific classification
- Domain: Eukaryota
- Kingdom: Animalia
- Phylum: Arthropoda
- Class: Insecta
- Order: Lepidoptera
- Family: Pyralidae
- Genus: Hypsotropa
- Species: H. makulanella

Binomial name
- Hypsotropa makulanella de Joannis, 1927

Species of moth

Hypsotropa makulanella is a species of snout moth in the genus Hypsotropa. It was described by Joseph de Joannis in 1927 and is known from Mozambique.
