= Epidauria strigosa =

Scientific classification
- Kingdom: Animalia
- Phylum: Arthropoda
- Class: Insecta
- Order: Lepidoptera
- Family: Pyralidae
- Genus: Epidauria
- Species: E. strigosa

Binomial name
- Epidauria strigosa (Staudinger, 1879)

Synonyms
- Anerastia strigosa Staudinger, 1879; Epidauria discella Hampson, 1901; Epidauria granatella Zerny, 1927

Species of moth

Epidauria strigosa is a species of snout moth in the genus Epidauria. It was first described by Staudinger in 1879, and is known from Turkey, Greece, Romania, Bosnia and Herzegovina, Croatia, Spain and Portugal.
