= Mesodiphlebia ochraceella =

Scientific classification
- Kingdom: Animalia
- Phylum: Arthropoda
- Class: Insecta
- Order: Lepidoptera
- Family: Pyralidae
- Genus: Mesodiphlebia
- Species: M. ochraceella

Binomial name
- Mesodiphlebia ochraceella Hampson, 1918

Species of moth

Mesodiphlebia ochraceella is a species of snout moth. It was described by George Hampson in 1918 and is known from Argentina.
