= Hypsotropa limbella =

Scientific classification
- Kingdom: Animalia
- Phylum: Arthropoda
- Clade: Pancrustacea
- Class: Insecta
- Order: Lepidoptera
- Family: Pyralidae
- Genus: Hypsotropa
- Species: H. limbella

Binomial name
- Hypsotropa limbella Zeller, 1848

Species of moth

Hypsotropa limbella is a species of snout moth in the genus Hypsotropa. It was described by Zeller in 1848. It is found in France, Italy, Croatia, Bosnia and Herzegovina, Albania, Greece, North Macedonia, Bulgaria, Romania and Asia Minor.

The wingspan is about 17 mm.
