= Ardekania albidiscella =

Scientific classification
- Kingdom: Animalia
- Phylum: Arthropoda
- Class: Insecta
- Order: Lepidoptera
- Family: Pyralidae
- Genus: Ardekania
- Species: A. albidiscella

Binomial name
- Ardekania albidiscella Amsel, 1954

Species of moth

Ardekania albidiscella is a species of snout moth in the genus Ardekania. It was described by Hans Georg Amsel in 1954 and is known from Iran.
