= Raphimetopus ablutella =

Scientific classification
- Kingdom: Animalia
- Phylum: Arthropoda
- Clade: Pancrustacea
- Class: Insecta
- Order: Lepidoptera
- Family: Pyralidae
- Genus: Raphimetopus
- Species: R. ablutella

Binomial name
- Raphimetopus ablutella (Zeller, 1839)

Synonyms
- Anerastia ablutella Zeller, 1839; Anerastia flaveolellus Ragonot, 1877; Anerastia seeboldi Ragonot, 1894; Emmalocera seeboldi; Rhinaphe seeboldi; Raphimetopus buxtoni Rothschild, 1921; Raphimetopus stigmatella Ragonot, 1888

Species of moth

Raphimetopus ablutella, the green borer, is a species of snout moth in the genus Raphimetopus. It was described by Philipp Christoph Zeller in 1894. It is found in Spain, Portugal, France, Italy, Romania, Bulgaria, North Macedonia, Greece, Israel, Saudi Arabia, Sudan, the United Arab Emirates, Yemen, India and South Africa.

The larvae have been recorded on Zea mays and Saccharum officinarum. They bore the shoots of their host plant.
