= Chortonoeca =

Scientific classification
- Kingdom: Animalia
- Phylum: Arthropoda
- Class: Insecta
- Order: Lepidoptera
- Family: Pyralidae
- Tribe: Anerastiini
- Genus: Chortonoeca; Hampson, 1918
- Species: C. leucocraspia

Binomial name
- Chortonoeca leucocraspia Hampson, 1918

Genus of moths

Chortonoeca is a monotypic snout moth genus in the family Pyralidae. Its single species, Chortonoeca leucocraspia, is known from Algeria. Both the genus and species were described by George Hampson in 1918.
