= Gymnancyla hornigii =

Scientific classification
- Kingdom: Animalia
- Phylum: Arthropoda
- Clade: Pancrustacea
- Class: Insecta
- Order: Lepidoptera
- Family: Pyralidae
- Genus: Gymnancyla
- Species: G. hornigii

Binomial name
- Gymnancyla hornigii (Lederer, 1852)

Synonyms
- Spermatophthora hornigii Lederer, 1852; Spermatophthora hornigi Hannemann, 1964; Spermatophthora horningii Heinemann, 1865; Gymnancyla gornigii Lederer, 1852

Species of moth

Gymnancyla hornigii is a species of moth in the family Pyralidae. It was described by Julius Lederer in 1852. It is found in most of Europe (except Ireland, Great Britain, the Benelux, Portugal, Switzerland, Slovenia, Ukraine, the Baltic region and Fennoscandia) and Turkey.

The wingspan is 18–20 mm.

The larvae feed on Atriplex oblongifolia and Chenopodium species.
