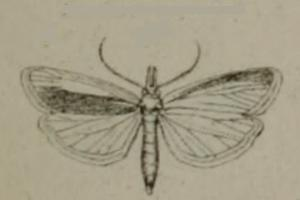
- Hypsotropa ichorella

Scientific classification
- Kingdom: Animalia
- Phylum: Arthropoda
- Clade: Pancrustacea
- Class: Insecta
- Order: Lepidoptera
- Family: Pyralidae
- Subfamily: Phycitinae
- Tribe: Anerastiini
- Genus: Hypsotropa; Zeller, 1848

Type species
- Hypsotropa limbella Zeller, 1848

Synonyms
- Heosphora Meyrick, 1882; Hypsotropha Snellen, 1880; Lymira Ragonot, 1888; Talamba Ragonot, 1888; Tiarra Ragonot, 1888

= Hypsotropa =

Genus of moths

Hypsotropa is a genus of snout moths. It was described by Philipp Christoph Zeller in 1848. The type species is Hypsotropa limbella.

== Species ==
- Hypsotropa adumbratella Ragonot, 1888
- Hypsotropa atakorella (Marion, 1957)
- Hypsotropa chionorhabda Hampson, 1918
- Hypsotropa contrastella (Ragonot, 1888)
- Hypsotropa diaphaea Hampson, 1918
- Hypsotropa endorhoda Hampson, 1918
- Hypsotropa fusifasciata Hampson, 1918
- Hypsotropa graptophlebia Hampson, 1918
- Hypsotropa heterocerella (Hampson, 1896)
- Hypsotropa ichorella Lederer, 1855
- Hypsotropa infumatella Ragonot, 1901
- Hypsotropa leucocraspis Hampson, 1918
- Hypsotropa limbella Zeller, 1848
- Hypsotropa makulanella de Joannis, 1927
- Hypsotropa monostidza Hampson, 1918
- Hypsotropa niveicosta Hampson, 1918
- Hypsotropa ochricostella Hampson, 1918
- Hypsotropa ocraceella Hampson, 1918
- Hypsotropa periphaea Hampson, 1918
- Hypsotropa pervittella Hampson, 1918
- Hypsotropa polystictella Hampson, 1918
- Hypsotropa punctinervella Hampson, 1918
- Hypsotropa purpurella Hampson, 1918
- Hypsotropa pusillella Ragonot, 1888
- Hypsotropa rhodochroella Hampson, 1918
- Hypsotropa roseotincta Janse, 1922
- Hypsotropa rosescens Hampson, 1918
- Hypsotropa sabuletella (Zeller, 1852)
- Hypsotropa subcostella Hampson, 1918
- Hypsotropa unipunctella Ragonot, 1888
- Hypsotropa vulneratella Zeller, 1847
