= Hypsotropa monostidza =

Scientific classification
- Domain: Eukaryota
- Kingdom: Animalia
- Phylum: Arthropoda
- Class: Insecta
- Order: Lepidoptera
- Family: Pyralidae
- Genus: Hypsotropa
- Species: H. monostidza

Binomial name
- Hypsotropa monostidza Hampson, 1918

Species of moth

Hypsotropa monostidza is a species of snout moth in the genus Hypsotropa. It was described by George Hampson in 1918 and is known from Sierra Leone.
