= Anerastia celsella =

Scientific classification
- Kingdom: Animalia
- Phylum: Arthropoda
- Class: Insecta
- Order: Lepidoptera
- Family: Pyralidae
- Genus: Anerastia
- Species: A. celsella

Binomial name
- Anerastia celsella Walker, 1863

Species of moth

Anerastia celsella is a moth of the family Pyralidae first described by Francis Walker in 1863. It is found in Sri Lanka.
