= Valdovecaria hispanicella =

Scientific classification
- Domain: Eukaryota
- Kingdom: Animalia
- Phylum: Arthropoda
- Class: Insecta
- Order: Lepidoptera
- Family: Pyralidae
- Genus: Valdovecaria
- Species: V. hispanicella

Binomial name
- Valdovecaria hispanicella (Herrich-Schäffer, 1855)

Synonyms
- Homoeosoma hispanicella Herrich-Schäffer, 1855; Myelois rhizobiella Staudinger, 1859

Species of moth

Valdovecaria hispanicella is a species of snout moth in the genus Valdovecaria. It was described by Gottlieb August Wilhelm Herrich-Schäffer in 1855. It is found in Spain and France.
