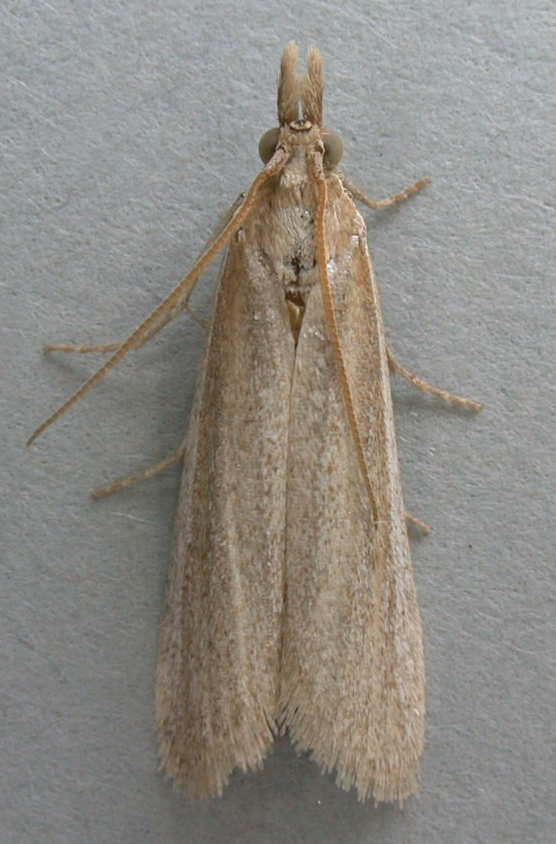

Scientific classification
- Domain: Eukaryota
- Kingdom: Animalia
- Phylum: Arthropoda
- Class: Insecta
- Order: Lepidoptera
- Family: Pyralidae
- Tribe: Anerastiini
- Genus: Anerastia; Hübner, 1825

Synonyms
- Anerastria Hübner, 1826; Prinanerastia Hampson, 1918; Prinanerastria Sharp, 1920

= Anerastia =

Genus of moths

Anerastia is a genus of snout moths. It was described by Jacob Hübner in 1825 and is known from Egypt and Sudan.

== Species ==
- Anerastia celsella Walker, 1863
- Anerastia dubia Gerasimov, 1929
- Anerastia flaveolella Ragonot, 1887
- Anerastia gnathosella (Amsel, 1954)
- Anerastia incarnata Staudinger, 1879
- Anerastia infumella Ragonot, 1887
- Anerastia lavatella Zerny in Rebel & Zerny, 1917
- Anerastia lotella (Hübner, 1813)
- Anerastia metallactis Meyrick, 1887
- Anerastia mitochroella Ragonot, 1888
- Anerastia stramineipennis Strand, 1919
