= Mesodiphlebia stricticostella =

Scientific classification
- Kingdom: Animalia
- Phylum: Arthropoda
- Class: Insecta
- Order: Lepidoptera
- Family: Pyralidae
- Genus: Mesodiphlebia
- Species: M. stricticostella

Binomial name
- Mesodiphlebia stricticostella Ragonot, 1887

Species of moth

Mesodiphlebia stricticostella is a species of snout moth. It was described by Émile Louis Ragonot in 1887 and is known from northern Nigeria.
