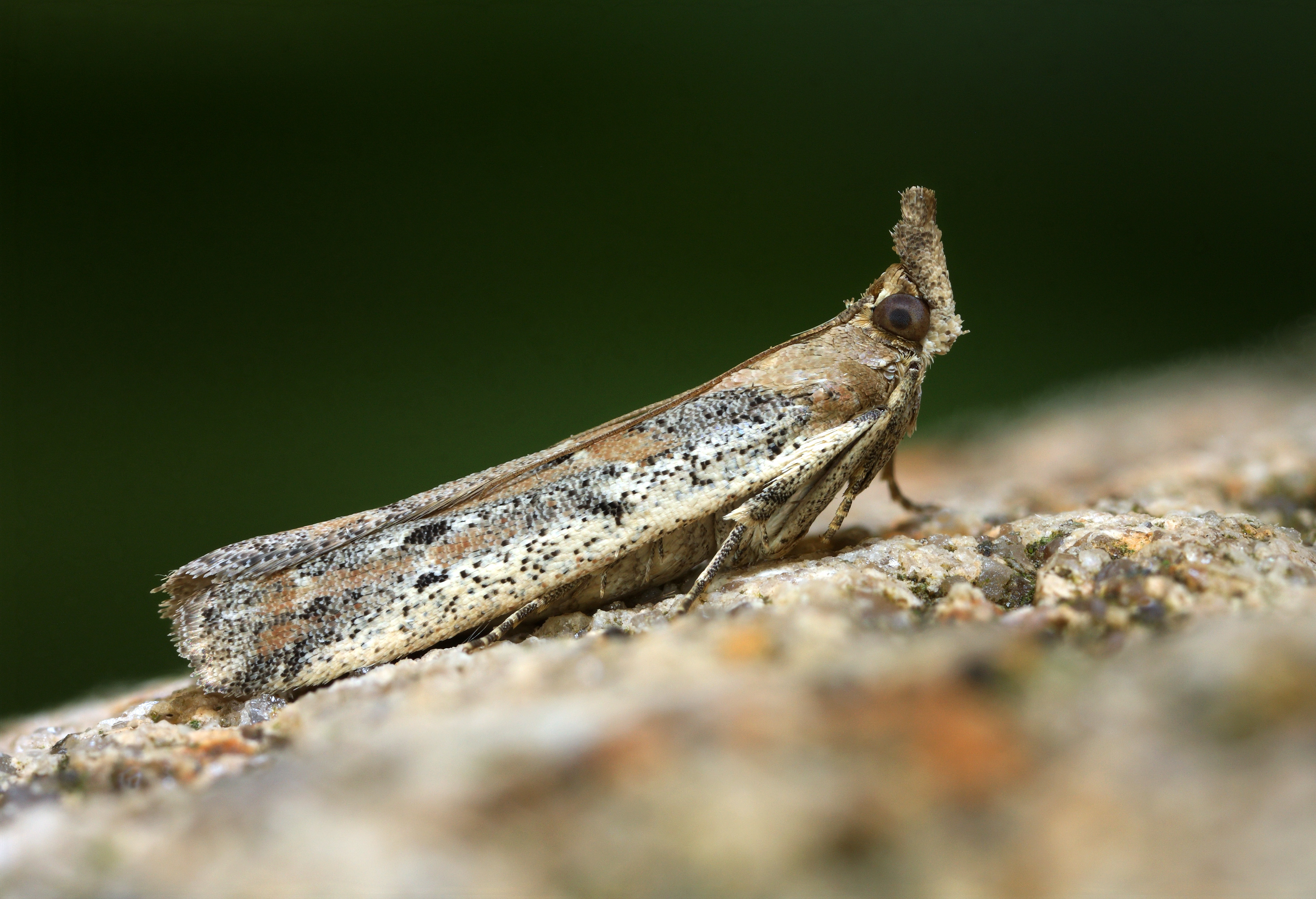

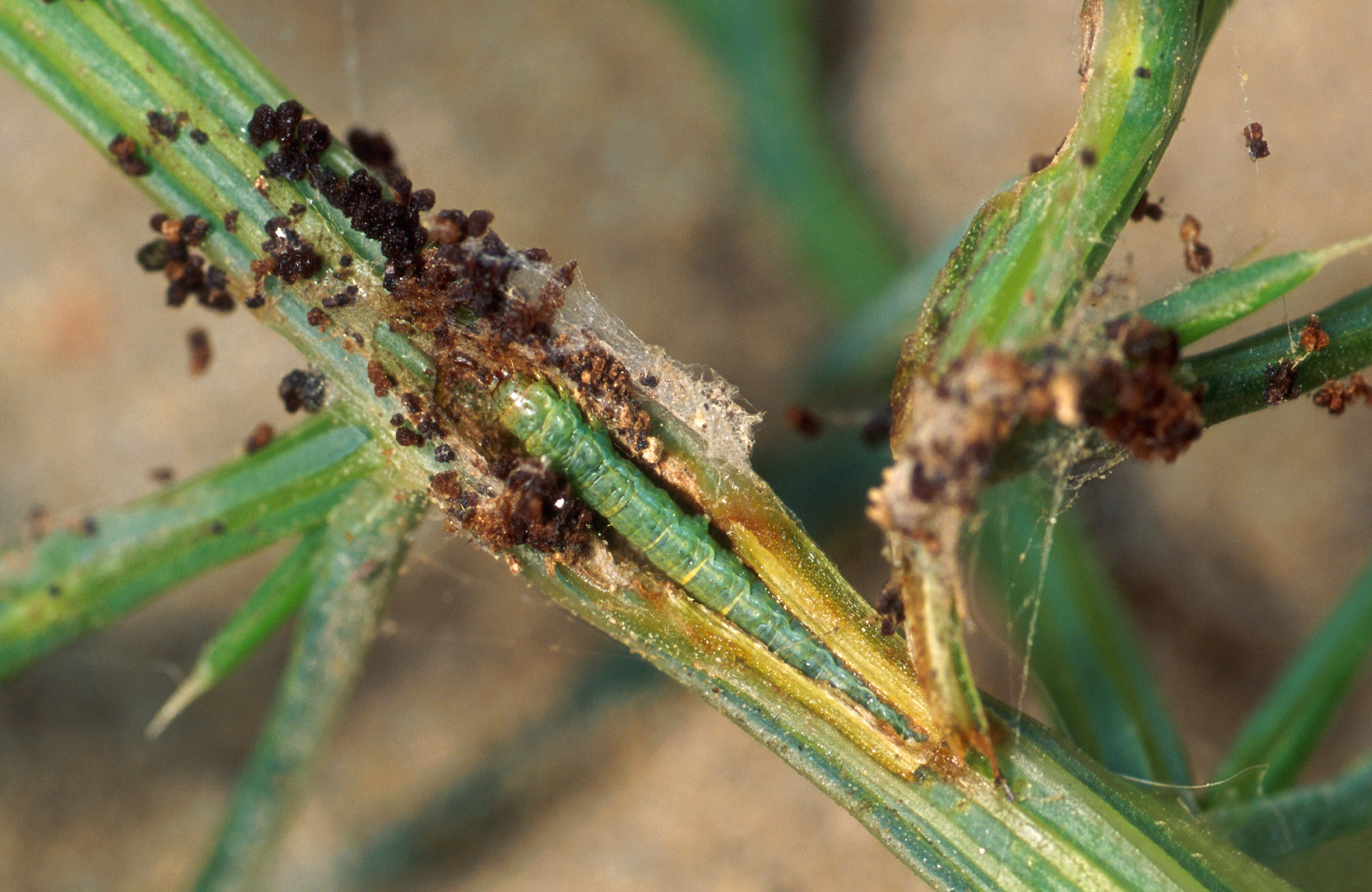

Scientific classification
- Domain: Eukaryota
- Kingdom: Animalia
- Phylum: Arthropoda
- Class: Insecta
- Order: Lepidoptera
- Family: Pyralidae
- Genus: Gymnancyla
- Species: G. canella

Binomial name
- Gymnancyla canella (Denis & Schiffermuller, 1775)

Synonyms
- Tinea canella Denis & Schiffermuller, 1775; Gesneria canellaris Hübner, 1825; Gymnancyla canella f. plumbea Huggins, 1958; Gymnancyla canella f. tessellata Huggins, 1956; Phycis depositella Zincken, 1818

= Gymnancyla canella =

Species of moth

Gymnancyla canella is a species of moth of the family Pyralidae. It is found in most of Europe, except Ireland, the Baltic region and Fennoscandia.

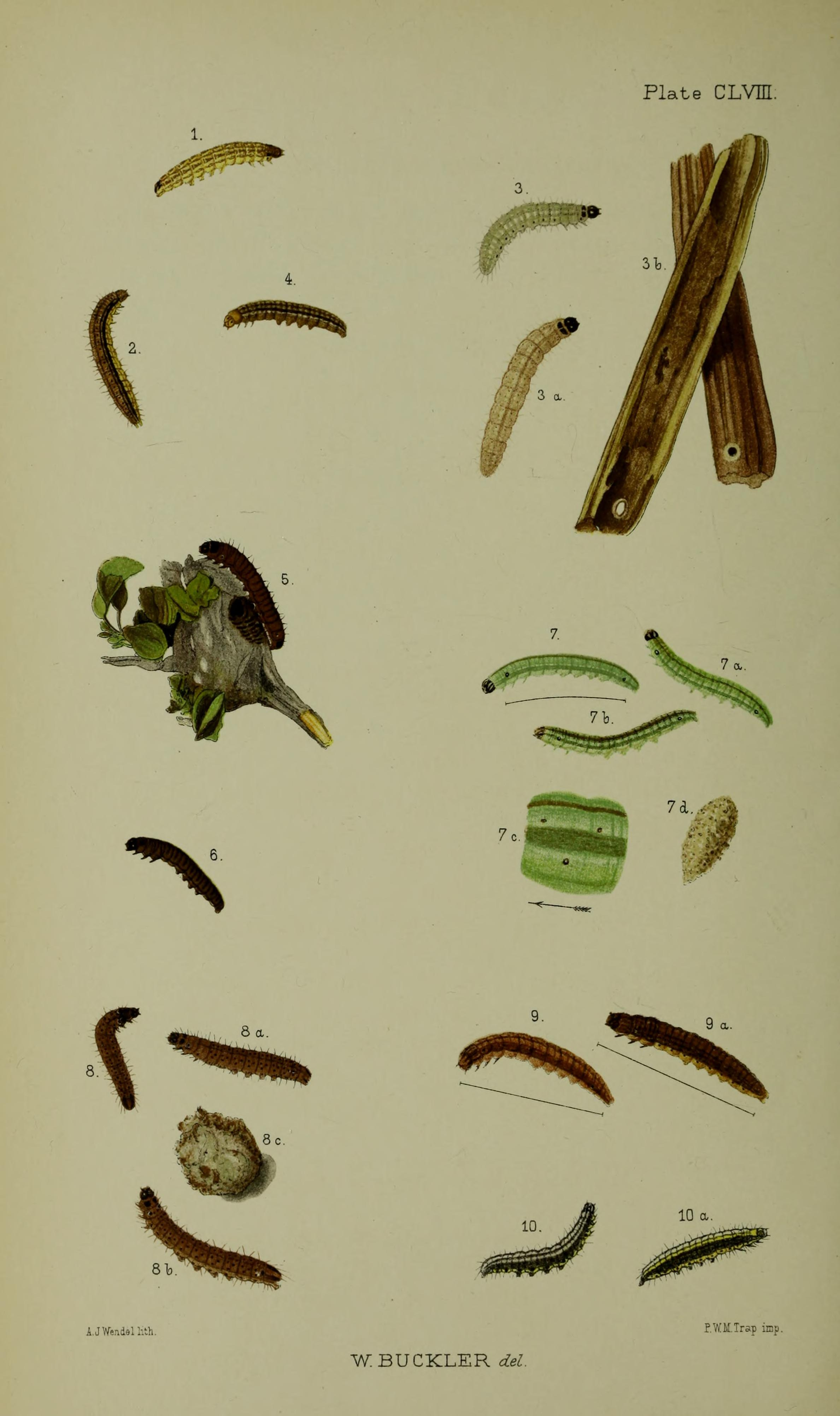
Figs. 7, 7a, 7b larva after final moult slightly magnified 7c enlargement of two segments 7d cocoon

The wingspan is 22–25 mm. Adults are on wing from June to August. The larvae feed on Salsola kali and sometimes Atriplex species.
