= Polyocha anerastiodes =

Scientific classification
- Kingdom: Animalia
- Phylum: Arthropoda
- Class: Insecta
- Order: Lepidoptera
- Family: Pyralidae
- Genus: Polyocha
- Species: P. anerastiodes

Binomial name
- Polyocha anerastiodes Warren & Rothschild, 1905

Species of moth

Polyocha anerastiodes is a species of snout moth. It is found in Sudan.
