= Seleucia (moth) =

Scientific classification
- Kingdom: Animalia
- Phylum: Arthropoda
- Class: Insecta
- Order: Lepidoptera
- Family: Pyralidae
- Tribe: Anerastiini
- Genus: Seleucia; Ragonot, 1887

Synonyms
- Lymira Ragonot, 1888

Genus of moths

Seleucia is a genus of snout moths. It was described by Émile Louis Ragonot in 1887.

== Species ==
- Seleucia karsholti Vives Moreno, 1995
- Seleucia pectinella (Chrétien, 1911)
- Seleucia semirosella Ragonot, 1887
