= Monoctenocera =

Scientific classification
- Kingdom: Animalia
- Phylum: Arthropoda
- Class: Insecta
- Order: Lepidoptera
- Family: Pyralidae
- Tribe: Anerastiini
- Genus: Monoctenocera; Hampson, 1899

Genus of moths

Monoctenocera is a genus of snout moths described by George Hampson in 1899.

== Species ==
- Monoctenocera brachiella Hampson in Ragonot, 1898
- Monoctenocera leucania (C. Felder, R. Felder & Rogenhofer, 1875)
