= Lioprosopa rhodobaphella =

Scientific classification
- Kingdom: Animalia
- Phylum: Arthropoda
- Class: Insecta
- Order: Lepidoptera
- Family: Pyralidae
- Genus: Lioprosopa
- Species: L. rhodobaphella

Binomial name
- Lioprosopa rhodobaphella (Ragonot, 1888)

Synonyms
- Statina rhodobaphella Ragonot, 1888; Heosphora chlorogramma Meyrick, 1889; Anerastria clepsiphronica Turner, 1947

Species of moth

Lioprosopa rhodobaphella is a species of snout moth in the genus Lioprosopa. It was described by Ragonot in 1888, and is known from Queensland, Australia; New Guinea, Celebes and Sangir Island, Indonesia.
