= Saluria ochridorsella =

Scientific classification
- Domain: Eukaryota
- Kingdom: Animalia
- Phylum: Arthropoda
- Class: Insecta
- Order: Lepidoptera
- Family: Pyralidae
- Genus: Saluria
- Species: S. ochridorsella

Binomial name
- Saluria ochridorsella Ragonot, 1888

Species of insect

Saluria ochridorsella is a moth of the family Pyralidae first described by Émile Louis Ragonot in 1888. It is found in India and Sri Lanka.
