= Lioprosopa neuricella =

Scientific classification
- Kingdom: Animalia
- Phylum: Arthropoda
- Class: Insecta
- Order: Lepidoptera
- Family: Pyralidae
- Genus: Lioprosopa
- Species: L. neuricella

Binomial name
- Lioprosopa neuricella (Hampson, 1918)

Synonyms
- Saluria neuricella Hampson, 1918

Species of moth

Lioprosopa neuricella is a species of snout moth in the genus Lioprosopa. It was described by George Hampson in 1918 and is known from Peak Downs, Queensland, Australia.
