= Valdovecaria =

Scientific classification
- Domain: Eukaryota
- Kingdom: Animalia
- Phylum: Arthropoda
- Class: Insecta
- Order: Lepidoptera
- Family: Pyralidae
- Tribe: Anerastiini
- Genus: Valdovecaria; Zerny, 1927

Genus of moths

Valdovecaria is a genus of moths of the family Pyralidae.

== Species ==
- Valdovecaria bradyrrhoella Zerny, 1927
- Valdovecaria hispanicella (Herrich-Schäffer, 1849)
- Valdovecaria umbratella (Treitschke, 1833)
- Valdovecaria unipunctella (Chrétien, 1911)
