= Lioprosopa albivena =

Scientific classification
- Kingdom: Animalia
- Phylum: Arthropoda
- Class: Insecta
- Order: Lepidoptera
- Family: Pyralidae
- Genus: Lioprosopa
- Species: L. albivena

Binomial name
- Lioprosopa albivena (Turner, 1947)

Synonyms
- Anerastria albivena Turner, 1947

Species of moth

Lioprosopa albivena is a species of snout moth in the genus Lioprosopa. It was described by Alfred Jefferis Turner in 1947, and is known from Australia.
