= Hypsotropa vulneratella =

Scientific classification
- Kingdom: Animalia
- Phylum: Arthropoda
- Clade: Pancrustacea
- Class: Insecta
- Order: Lepidoptera
- Family: Pyralidae
- Genus: Hypsotropa
- Species: H. vulneratella

Binomial name
- Hypsotropa vulneratella (Zeller, 1847)

Synonyms
- Epischnia vulneratella Zeller, 1847; Anerastia ostrinella Harpe, 1861; Hypsotropa roseostrigella Ragonot, 1901

Species of moth

Hypsotropa vulneratella is a species of snout moth in the genus Hypsotropa. It was described by Zeller in 1847, and is known from Syria, Croatia, France, Spain, Portugal, Sardinia and Sicily.
