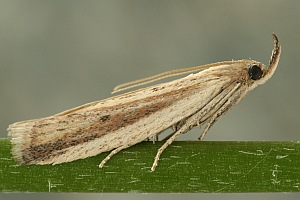

Scientific classification
- Domain: Eukaryota
- Kingdom: Animalia
- Phylum: Arthropoda
- Class: Insecta
- Order: Lepidoptera
- Family: Pyralidae
- Genus: Hypsotropa
- Species: H. unipunctella

Binomial name
- Hypsotropa unipunctella Ragonot, 1888

Synonyms
- Hypsotropa wertheimsteini Rebel, 1913

= Hypsotropa unipunctella =

Species of moth

Hypsotropa unipunctella is a species of snout moth in the genus Hypsotropa. It was described by Ragonot in 1888, and is known from Hungary, Romania and Slovakia.

The wingspan is about 16 mm.
