= Mesodiphlebia crassivenia =

Scientific classification
- Kingdom: Animalia
- Phylum: Arthropoda
- Clade: Pancrustacea
- Class: Insecta
- Order: Lepidoptera
- Family: Pyralidae
- Genus: Mesodiphlebia
- Species: M. crassivenia

Binomial name
- Mesodiphlebia crassivenia (Zeller, 1881)

Synonyms
- Anerastia crassivenia Zeller, 1881; Schenectadia merilesella Dyar, 1914

Species of moth

Mesodiphlebia crassivenia is a species of snout moth. It was described by Zeller in 1881, and is known from Panama.
