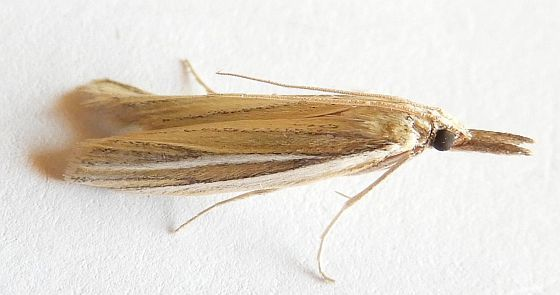

Scientific classification
- Kingdom: Animalia
- Phylum: Arthropoda
- Clade: Pancrustacea
- Class: Insecta
- Order: Lepidoptera
- Family: Pyralidae
- Genus: Arivaca
- Species: A. ostreella

Binomial name
- Arivaca ostreella (Ragonot, 1887)

Synonyms
- Saluria ostreella Ragonot, 1887; Peoria discostrigella Dyar, 1904

= Arivaca ostreella =

Species of moth

Arivaca ostreella is a species of snout moth described by Émile Louis Ragonot in 1887. It is found in the US from southern Arizona through New Mexico to Texas.

The wingspan is about 25 mm. Adults are on wing in July.
