= Homosassa (moth) =

Scientific classification
- Kingdom: Animalia
- Phylum: Arthropoda
- Class: Insecta
- Order: Lepidoptera
- Family: Pyralidae
- Tribe: Anerastiini
- Genus: Homosassa; Hulst, 1890

Genus of moths

Homosassa is a genus of snout moths described by George Duryea Hulst in 1890.

== Species ==
- Homosassa blanchardi Shaffer, 1976
- Homosassa ella (Hulst, 1887)
- Homosassa incudella Shaffer, 1968
- Homosassa platella Shaffer, 1968
