= Lioprosopa microrrhoda =

Scientific classification
- Kingdom: Animalia
- Phylum: Arthropoda
- Class: Insecta
- Order: Lepidoptera
- Family: Pyralidae
- Genus: Lioprosopa
- Species: L. microrrhoda

Binomial name
- Lioprosopa microrrhoda (Turner, 1923)

Synonyms
- Anerastria microrrhoda Turner, 1923

Species of moth

Lioprosopa microrrhoda is a species of snout moth in the genus Lioprosopa. It was described by Turner in 1923, and is known from Australia.
