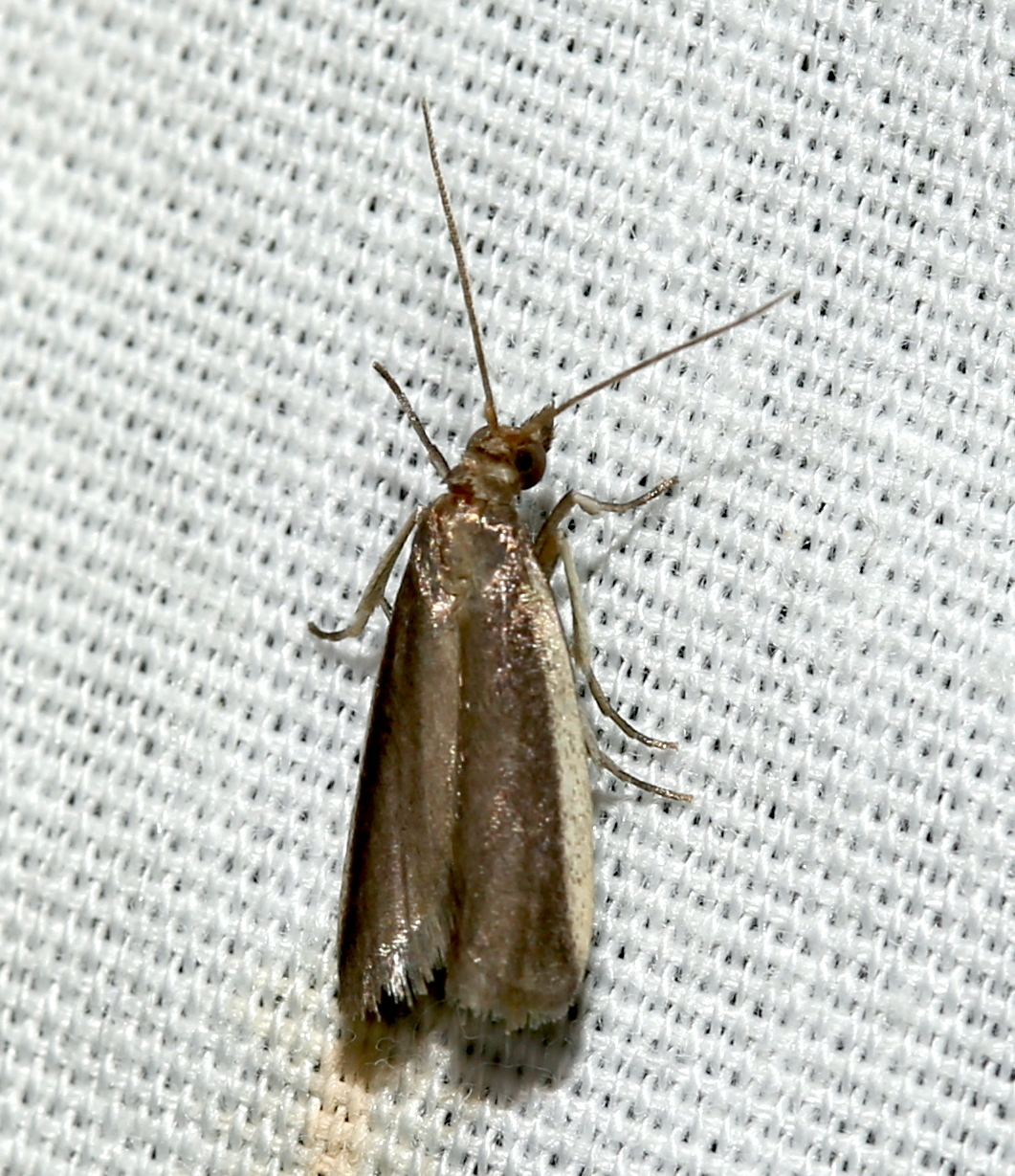

Scientific classification
- Kingdom: Animalia
- Phylum: Arthropoda
- Class: Insecta
- Order: Lepidoptera
- Family: Pyralidae
- Genus: Homosassa
- Species: H. ella

Binomial name
- Homosassa ella (Hulst, 1887)

Synonyms
- Ephestia ella Hulst, 1887

= Homosassa ella =

Species of moth

Homosassa ella is a species of snout moth. It was described by George Duryea Hulst in 1887. It is found in North America, including Florida, Oklahoma, South Carolina and West Virginia.
