= Saluria =

Scientific classification
- Domain: Eukaryota
- Kingdom: Animalia
- Phylum: Arthropoda
- Class: Insecta
- Order: Lepidoptera
- Family: Pyralidae
- Tribe: Anerastiini
- Genus: Saluria; Ragonot, 1887

Genus of moths

Saluria is a genus of snout moths. It was described by Émile Louis Ragonot in 1887.

== Species ==
- Saluria carnescens Hampson, 1918
- Saluria flavicosta Hampson, 1918
- Saluria hilgerti (Rothschild, 1915)
- Saluria inficita Walker, 1863
- Saluria insignificella Hampson, 1918
- Saluria interpunctella Hampson, 1918
- Saluria jordanella Ragonot, 1888
- Saluria lentistrigella Hampson, 1918
- Saluria maculivittella Ragonot, 1887
- Saluria mesomelanella Hampson, 1918
- Saluria musaeella (Schaus, 1913)
- Saluria nilgiriensis Hampson, 1918
- Saluria nimbelloides de Joannis, 1927
- Saluria ochridorsella Ragonot, 1888
- Saluria pectigerella Ragonot, 1887
- Saluria proleucella Hampson, 1918
- Saluria psammatella Hampson, 1918
- Saluria rhodophaea Hampson, 1918
- Saluria rufella Hampson, 1918
- Saluria semirosella Hampson, 1918
- Saluria stictophora Hampson, 1918
- Saluria subcostella Hampson, 1918
- Saluria tenuicosta Hampson, 1918
- Saluria violodis (Dyar, 1914)
