= Epidauria chionocraspis =

Scientific classification
- Kingdom: Animalia
- Phylum: Arthropoda
- Class: Insecta
- Order: Lepidoptera
- Family: Pyralidae
- Genus: Epidauria
- Species: E. chionocraspis

Binomial name
- Epidauria chionocraspis Hampson, 1918

Species of moth

Epidauria chionocraspis is a species of snout moth in the genus Epidauria. It was described by George Hampson in 1918, and is known from Malawi.
