= Arivaca pimella =

Scientific classification
- Kingdom: Animalia
- Phylum: Arthropoda
- Class: Insecta
- Order: Lepidoptera
- Family: Pyralidae
- Genus: Arivaca
- Species: A. pimella

Binomial name
- Arivaca pimella (Dyar, 1906)

Synonyms
- Poujadia pimella Dyar, 1906

Species of moth

Arivaca pimella is a species of snout moth described by Harrison Gray Dyar Jr. in 1906. It is found in the US in southern Arizona.

The length of the forewings is about 13 mm. The forewings are sprinkled with brown and white anterior to the cell. The cell is brownish white. The hindwings are light brown in females and somewhat darker in males.
