= Hosidia =

Scientific classification
- Kingdom: Animalia
- Phylum: Arthropoda
- Class: Insecta
- Order: Lepidoptera
- Family: Pyralidae
- Tribe: Anerastiini
- Genus: Hosidia; Hampson in Ragonot, 1901
- Species: H. ochrineurella

Binomial name
- Hosidia ochrineurella Hampson in Ragonot, 1901

Genus of moths

Hosidia is a monotypic snout moth genus described by George Hampson in 1901. Its only member, Hosidia ochrineurella, is found in South Africa.
