= Epidauria fulvella =

Scientific classification
- Kingdom: Animalia
- Phylum: Arthropoda
- Class: Insecta
- Order: Lepidoptera
- Family: Pyralidae
- Genus: Epidauria
- Species: E. fulvella

Binomial name
- Epidauria fulvella Kuznetzov, 1978

Synonyms
- Polyocha fulvella (Kuznetzov, 1978)

Species of moth

Epidauria fulvella is a species of snout moth in the genus Epidauria. It was described by Vladimir Ivanovitsch Kuznetzov in 1978 and is known from Tajikistan.
