= Tortilia charadritis =

Scientific classification
- Domain: Eukaryota
- Kingdom: Animalia
- Phylum: Arthropoda
- Class: Insecta
- Order: Lepidoptera
- Family: Stathmopodidae
- Genus: Tortilia
- Species: T. charadritis

Binomial name
- Tortilia charadritis (Meyrick, 1924)

Synonyms
- Isorrhoa charadritis Meyrick, 1924; Stagmatophora stupenda Turati, 1927; Tortilia oiatrix Busck, 1934; Apertodiscus zernyi Amsel, 1935; Stathmopoda trissorrhiza Meyrick, 1939

Species of moth

Tortilia charadritis is a species of moth in the Stathmopodidae family. It is found from North Africa through the Middle East to western Pakistan. It is an introduced species in the eastern part of the United States.

The wingspan is 7–9 mm. Adults have been recorded from May to July.

The larvae feed on the leaves of various Cassia, that have been imported to the United States from Sudan. Larvae have also been found on the fruits of various Ziziphus species.
