= Anchylobela nitens =

Scientific classification
- Kingdom: Animalia
- Phylum: Arthropoda
- Clade: Pancrustacea
- Class: Insecta
- Order: Lepidoptera
- Family: Pyralidae
- Genus: Anchylobela
- Species: A. nitens

Binomial name
- Anchylobela nitens (Butler, 1886)

Synonyms
- Anerastia nitens Butler, 1886

Species of moth

Anchylobela nitens is a species of snout moth in the genus Anchylobela. It was described by Arthur Gardiner Butler in 1886, and is known from Australia.
