= Ardekanopsis =

Scientific classification
- Kingdom: Animalia
- Phylum: Arthropoda
- Class: Insecta
- Order: Lepidoptera
- Family: Pyralidae
- Tribe: Anerastiini
- Genus: Ardekanopsis; Amsel, 1954
- Species: A. griseella

Binomial name
- Ardekanopsis griseella Amsel, 1954

Genus of moths

Ardekanopsis is a monotypic snout moth genus described by Hans Georg Amsel in 1954. Its one species, also described by Amsel, is Ardekanopsis griseella. It is found in Iran.
