= Asaluria =

Scientific classification
- Kingdom: Animalia
- Phylum: Arthropoda
- Class: Insecta
- Order: Lepidoptera
- Family: Pyralidae
- Tribe: Anerastiini
- Genus: Asaluria; Amsel, 1958
- Species: A. reisseri

Binomial name
- Asaluria reisseri Amsel, 1958

Genus of moths

Asaluria is a genus of snout moths. It was described by Hans Georg Amsel in 1958 and contains the species Asaluria reisseri. It is found in Iran.
