= Monoctenocera leucania =

Scientific classification
- Kingdom: Animalia
- Phylum: Arthropoda
- Class: Insecta
- Order: Lepidoptera
- Family: Pyralidae
- Genus: Monoctenocera
- Species: M. leucania

Binomial name
- Monoctenocera leucania (C. Felder, R. Felder & Rogenhofer, 1875)

Synonyms
- Catagela leucania C. Felder, R. Felder & Rogenhofer, 1875

Species of moth

Monoctenocera leucania is a species of snout moth in the genus Monoctenocera. It was described by Cajetan Felder, Rudolf Felder and Alois Friedrich Rogenhofer in 1875. It is found in Sri Lanka.
