= Tortilia graeca =

Scientific classification
- Domain: Eukaryota
- Kingdom: Animalia
- Phylum: Arthropoda
- Class: Insecta
- Order: Lepidoptera
- Family: Stathmopodidae
- Genus: Tortilia
- Species: T. graeca

Binomial name
- Tortilia graeca Kasy, 1981

Species of insect

Tortilia graeca is a species of moth in the Stathmopodidae family. It is found in Greece, Crete and Turkey.

The wingspan is 8–10 mm. Adults have been recorded from June to July.
