= Hypsotropa atakorella =

Scientific classification
- Domain: Eukaryota
- Kingdom: Animalia
- Phylum: Arthropoda
- Class: Insecta
- Order: Lepidoptera
- Family: Pyralidae
- Genus: Hypsotropa
- Species: H. atakorella

Binomial name
- Hypsotropa atakorella (Marion, 1957)

Synonyms
- Heosphora atakorella Marion, 1957

Species of moth

Hypsotropa atakorella is a species of snout moth in the genus Hypsotropa. It was described by Hubert Marion in 1957 and is known from west Africa.
