= Saluria inficita =

Scientific classification
- Kingdom: Animalia
- Phylum: Arthropoda
- Class: Insecta
- Order: Lepidoptera
- Family: Pyralidae
- Genus: Saluria
- Species: S. inficita

Binomial name
- Saluria inficita Walker, 1863

Species of moth

Saluria inficita, the white stem borer, is a moth of the family Pyralidae. The species was first described by Francis Walker in 1863. It is found in India and Sri Lanka.

Its caterpillars are pests of Eleusine coracana, Oryza sativa, Setaria italica and Zea mays.

== Description ==
The adult has brownish wings. A pale white band runs along the margin of the forewings. The hindwings are white. The caterpillar is whitish creamy coloured with a yellow head. Its eggs are grey with a tuft of hairs. The pupa are brownish.

Caterpillars attack root areas of the plant and then bore into the soft tissues. After severe infestations, the plants show dried up shoots and turn yellow. Damage can controlled by hand picking, pheromone usage, light traps and usage of chemical insecticides such as carabaryl, methyl parathion, phosphomidon or dimethoate.
