= Anerastia lavatella =

Scientific classification
- Domain: Eukaryota
- Kingdom: Animalia
- Phylum: Arthropoda
- Class: Insecta
- Order: Lepidoptera
- Family: Pyralidae
- Genus: Anerastia
- Species: A. lavatella

Binomial name
- Anerastia lavatella Zerny in Rebel & Zerny, 1917

Species of moth

Anerastia lavatella is a species of snout moth in the genus Anerastia. It was described by Zerny, in 1917, and is known from Sudan.
