= Hypsotropa heterocerella =

Scientific classification
- Kingdom: Animalia
- Phylum: Arthropoda
- Class: Insecta
- Order: Lepidoptera
- Family: Pyralidae
- Genus: Hypsotropa
- Species: H. heterocerella

Binomial name
- Hypsotropa heterocerella (Hampson, 1896)

Synonyms
- Hypsotropha heterocerella Hampson, 1896

Species of moth

Hypsotropa heterocerella is a species of snout moth in the genus Hypsotropa. It was described by George Hampson in 1896 and is known from Kashmir and Punjab in India.
