= Polyocha venosa =

Scientific classification
- Kingdom: Animalia
- Phylum: Arthropoda
- Clade: Pancrustacea
- Class: Insecta
- Order: Lepidoptera
- Family: Pyralidae
- Genus: Polyocha
- Species: P. venosa

Binomial name
- Polyocha venosa (Zeller, 1847)

Synonyms
- Epischnia venosa Zeller, 1847

Species of moth

Polyocha venosa is a species of snout moth. It is found in Greece, Turkey, as well as Israel.
