= Anerastia gnathosella =

Scientific classification
- Domain: Eukaryota
- Kingdom: Animalia
- Phylum: Arthropoda
- Class: Insecta
- Order: Lepidoptera
- Family: Pyralidae
- Genus: Anerastia
- Species: A. gnathosella

Binomial name
- Anerastia gnathosella (Amsel, 1954)

Synonyms
- Prinanerastia gnathosella Amsel, 1954

Species of moth

Anerastia gnathosella is a species of snout moth in the genus Anerastia. It was described by Hans Georg Amsel in 1954 and is known from Egypt.
