= Discofrontia =

Scientific classification
- Kingdom: Animalia
- Phylum: Arthropoda
- Class: Insecta
- Order: Lepidoptera
- Family: Pyralidae
- Tribe: Anerastiini
- Genus: Discofrontia; Hampson in Ragonot, 1891
- Species: D. normella

Binomial name
- Discofrontia normella Hampson, 1901

Genus of moths

Discofrontia is a monotypic snout moth genus in the family Pyralidae. Its single species, Discofrontia normella, is found in South Africa. The genus was described by George Hampson in 1891, but the species was described by the same author in 1901.
