= Comorta plinthina =

Scientific classification
- Kingdom: Animalia
- Phylum: Arthropoda
- Class: Insecta
- Order: Lepidoptera
- Family: Pyralidae
- Genus: Comorta
- Species: C. plinthina

Binomial name
- Comorta plinthina (Turner, 1905)

Synonyms
- Anerastria plinthina Turner, 1905

Species of moth

Comorta plinthina is a species of moth of the family Pyralidae described by Alfred Jefferis Turner in 1905. It is found in northern Australia.
