= Tortilia pallidella =

Scientific classification
- Domain: Eukaryota
- Kingdom: Animalia
- Phylum: Arthropoda
- Class: Insecta
- Order: Lepidoptera
- Family: Stathmopodidae
- Genus: Tortilia
- Species: T. pallidella

Binomial name
- Tortilia pallidella Kasy, 1973

Species of moth

Tortilia pallidella is a species of moth in the Stathmopodidae family. It is found in the Near East and Middle East, Israel, southern Iran and western Pakistan.

The wingspan is 6.3-8.9 mm.

In Iran, adults have been found under old Acacia trees in the first half of April. In Pakistan, adults have been recorded from the end of February to the beginning of March. In Israel, adults have been found in mid-August.
