= Comorta zophopleura =

Scientific classification
- Kingdom: Animalia
- Phylum: Arthropoda
- Class: Insecta
- Order: Lepidoptera
- Family: Pyralidae
- Genus: Comorta
- Species: C. zophopleura

Binomial name
- Comorta zophopleura (Turner, 1904)

Synonyms
- Hypsotropha zophopleura Turner, 1904

Species of moth

Comorta zophopleura is a species of moth of the family Pyralidae described by Alfred Jefferis Turner in 1904. It is found in Australia.
