= Anerastia stramineipennis =

Scientific classification
- Domain: Eukaryota
- Kingdom: Animalia
- Phylum: Arthropoda
- Class: Insecta
- Order: Lepidoptera
- Family: Pyralidae
- Genus: Anerastia
- Species: A. stramineipennis

Binomial name
- Anerastia stramineipennis Strand, 1919

Species of moth

Anerastia stramineipennis is a species of snout moth in the genus Anerastia. It was described by Strand in 1919. It is found in Taiwan.
