= Dembea venulosella =

Scientific classification
- Kingdom: Animalia
- Phylum: Arthropoda
- Clade: Pancrustacea
- Class: Insecta
- Order: Lepidoptera
- Family: Pyralidae
- Subfamily: Phycitinae
- Tribe: Anerastiini
- Genus: Dembea; Ragonot, 1888
- Species: D. venulosella

Binomial name
- Dembea venulosella Ragonot, 1888

Species of moth

Dembea venulosella is the only species in the monotypic moth genus Dembea of the family Pyralidae (snout moths). The genus and species were described by Émile Louis Ragonot in 1888. It is found in Ethiopia, Nigeria and Central Africa.
