= Anerastia mitochroella =

Scientific classification
- Kingdom: Animalia
- Phylum: Arthropoda
- Class: Insecta
- Order: Lepidoptera
- Family: Pyralidae
- Genus: Anerastia
- Species: A. mitochroella

Binomial name
- Anerastia mitochroella Ragonot, 1888

Synonyms
- Anerastia mictochroella

Species of moth

Anerastia mitochroella is a species of snout moth in the genus Anerastia. It was described by Émile Louis Ragonot in 1888, and is known to be from Argentina.
