= Gymnancyla barbatella =

Scientific classification
- Domain: Eukaryota
- Kingdom: Animalia
- Phylum: Arthropoda
- Class: Insecta
- Order: Lepidoptera
- Family: Pyralidae
- Genus: Gymnancyla
- Species: G. barbatella

Binomial name
- Gymnancyla barbatella Erschoff, 1874

Synonyms
- Ancylosis gobiella Caradja, 1916

Species of moth

Gymnancyla barbatella is a species of snout moth in the genus Gymnancyla. It was described by Nikolay Grigoryevich Erschoff in 1874 and is known from Russia, Uzbekistan and the Gobi Desert.
