= Ardekania farsella =

Scientific classification
- Kingdom: Animalia
- Phylum: Arthropoda
- Class: Insecta
- Order: Lepidoptera
- Family: Pyralidae
- Genus: Ardekania
- Species: A. farsella

Binomial name
- Ardekania farsella Amsel, 1951

Species of moth

Ardekania farsella is a species of snout moth in the genus Ardekania. It was described by Hans Georg Amsel in 1951. It is found in Iran.
