= Hypsotropa infumatella =

Scientific classification
- Domain: Eukaryota
- Kingdom: Animalia
- Phylum: Arthropoda
- Class: Insecta
- Order: Lepidoptera
- Family: Pyralidae
- Genus: Hypsotropa
- Species: H. infumatella

Binomial name
- Hypsotropa infumatella Ragonot, 1901

Species of moth

Hypsotropa infumatella is a species of snout moth in the genus Hypsotropa. It was described by Ragonot in 1901, and is known from South Africa.
