= Arivaca albidella =

Scientific classification
- Domain: Eukaryota
- Kingdom: Animalia
- Phylum: Arthropoda
- Class: Insecta
- Order: Lepidoptera
- Family: Pyralidae
- Genus: Arivaca
- Species: A. albidella

Binomial name
- Arivaca albidella (Hulst, 1900)

Synonyms
- Peoria albidella Hulst, 1900

Species of moth

Arivaca albidella is a species of snout moth described by George Duryea Hulst in 1900. It is found in the Southwestern United States.
