= Laurentia inclarella =

Scientific classification
- Domain: Eukaryota
- Kingdom: Animalia
- Phylum: Arthropoda
- Class: Insecta
- Order: Lepidoptera
- Family: Pyralidae
- Genus: Laurentia
- Species: L. inclarella

Binomial name
- Laurentia inclarella Ragonot, 1888

Species of moth

Laurentia inclarella is a species of snout moth. It was described by Émile Louis Ragonot in 1888. It is found on Java.
