= Coenotropa =

Scientific classification
- Kingdom: Animalia
- Phylum: Arthropoda
- Class: Insecta
- Order: Lepidoptera
- Family: Pyralidae
- Tribe: Anerastiini
- Genus: Coenotropa; Hampson, 1918
- Species: C. limitella

Binomial name
- Coenotropa limitella Hampson, 1918

Genus of moths

Coenotropa is a genus of snout moths. It was described by George Hampson in 1918 and contains the species Coenotropa limitella. It is found in Paraguay.
