= Arivaca (moth) =

Scientific classification
- Domain: Eukaryota
- Kingdom: Animalia
- Phylum: Arthropoda
- Class: Insecta
- Order: Lepidoptera
- Family: Pyralidae
- Tribe: Anerastiini
- Genus: Arivaca; J. C. Shaffer, 1968

Genus of moths

Arivaca is a genus of snout moths. It was described by Jay C. Shaffer in 1968.

== Species ==
- Arivaca albicostella (Grossbeck, 1917)
- Arivaca albidella (Hulst, 1900)
- Arivaca artella Shaffer, 1968
- Arivaca linella Shaffer, 1968
- Arivaca ostreella (Ragonot, 1887)
- Arivaca pimella (Dyar, 1906)
- Arivaca poohella Shaffer, 1968
