= Anchylobela dyseimata =

Scientific classification
- Kingdom: Animalia
- Phylum: Arthropoda
- Class: Insecta
- Order: Lepidoptera
- Family: Pyralidae
- Genus: Anchylobela
- Species: A. dyseimata

Binomial name
- Anchylobela dyseimata (Turner, 1913)

Synonyms
- Hypsotropha dyseimata Turner, 1913; Anerastria acrophaea Turner, 1913

Species of moth

Anchylobela dyseimata is a species of snout moth in the genus Anchylobela. It was described by Alfred Jefferis Turner in 1913, and is known from Australia.
