= Lioprosopa rhodosticha =

Scientific classification
- Kingdom: Animalia
- Phylum: Arthropoda
- Class: Insecta
- Order: Lepidoptera
- Family: Pyralidae
- Genus: Lioprosopa
- Species: L. rhodosticha

Binomial name
- Lioprosopa rhodosticha (Turner, 1904)

Synonyms
- Hypsotropha rhodosticha Turner, 1904

Species of moth

Lioprosopa rhodosticha is a species of snout moth in the genus Lioprosopa. It was described by Turner in 1904, and is known from Australia.
