= Tortilia trigonella =

Scientific classification
- Domain: Eukaryota
- Kingdom: Animalia
- Phylum: Arthropoda
- Class: Insecta
- Order: Lepidoptera
- Family: Stathmopodidae
- Genus: Tortilia
- Species: T. trigonella

Binomial name
- Tortilia trigonella (Zerny, 1935)

Species of moth

Tortilia trigonella is a species of moth in the family Stathmopodidae. It is found in Morocco south-west of Marrakesch, in the High Atlas near Goundafa and in Middle Atlas near Azrou.

The wingspan is about 9 mm. Adults have been recorded in June.
