= Epidauria transversariella =

Scientific classification
- Kingdom: Animalia
- Phylum: Arthropoda
- Clade: Pancrustacea
- Class: Insecta
- Order: Lepidoptera
- Family: Pyralidae
- Genus: Epidauria
- Species: E. transversariella

Binomial name
- Epidauria transversariella (Zeller, 1848)

Synonyms
- Anerastia transversariella Zeller, 1848

Species of moth

Epidauria transversariella is a species of snout moth in the genus Epidauria. It was described by Zeller in 1848. It is found in Croatia and Greece.
