= Polyocha =

Scientific classification
- Domain: Eukaryota
- Kingdom: Animalia
- Phylum: Arthropoda
- Class: Insecta
- Order: Lepidoptera
- Family: Pyralidae
- Tribe: Anerastiini
- Genus: Polyocha; Zeller, 1848

Genus of moths

Polyocha is a genus of snout moths. It was described by Philipp Christoph Zeller in 1848.

== Species ==
- Polyocha anerastiodes Warren & Rothschild, 1905
- Polyocha anomalella Janse, 1922
- Polyocha depressellus (Swinhoe, 1885
- Polyocha ereboctena Meyrick, 1935
- Polyocha flagrantella Ragonot, 1901
- Polyocha foucarti Ragonot, 1887
- Polyocha fuscicostella Hampson, 1918
- Polyocha largella Caradja, 1925
- Polyocha leucopleurella (Ragonot, 1888)
- Polyocha monochromella Ragonot, 1888
- Polyocha neuropterella Ragonot, 1887
- Polyocha plinthocroa Hampson, 1918
- Polyocha rhodesiae Strand, 1909
- Polyocha sanguinariella Zeller, 1848
- Polyocha subfasciatella Ragonot, 1887
- Polyocha venosa (Zeller, 1847)
- Polyocha vesculella Ragonot, 1888
