= Seleucia karsholti =

Scientific classification
- Kingdom: Animalia
- Phylum: Arthropoda
- Clade: Pancrustacea
- Class: Insecta
- Order: Lepidoptera
- Family: Pyralidae
- Genus: Seleucia
- Species: S. karsholti

Binomial name
- Seleucia karsholti Vives, 1995

Species of moth

Seleucia karsholti is a species of snout moth that is found in Spain.
