= Arivaca artella =

Scientific classification
- Domain: Eukaryota
- Kingdom: Animalia
- Phylum: Arthropoda
- Class: Insecta
- Order: Lepidoptera
- Family: Pyralidae
- Genus: Arivaca
- Species: A. artella

Binomial name
- Arivaca artella Shaffer, 1968

Species of moth

Arivaca artella is a species of snout moth. It is found in the US states of Arizona and New Mexico.
