= Anerastia metallactis =

Scientific classification
- Kingdom: Animalia
- Phylum: Arthropoda
- Class: Insecta
- Order: Lepidoptera
- Family: Pyralidae
- Genus: Anerastia
- Species: A. metallactis

Binomial name
- Anerastia metallactis Meyrick, 1887

Species of moth

Anerastia metallactis is a species of snout moth in the genus Anerastia. It was described by Edward Meyrick in 1887. It is found in Australia.
