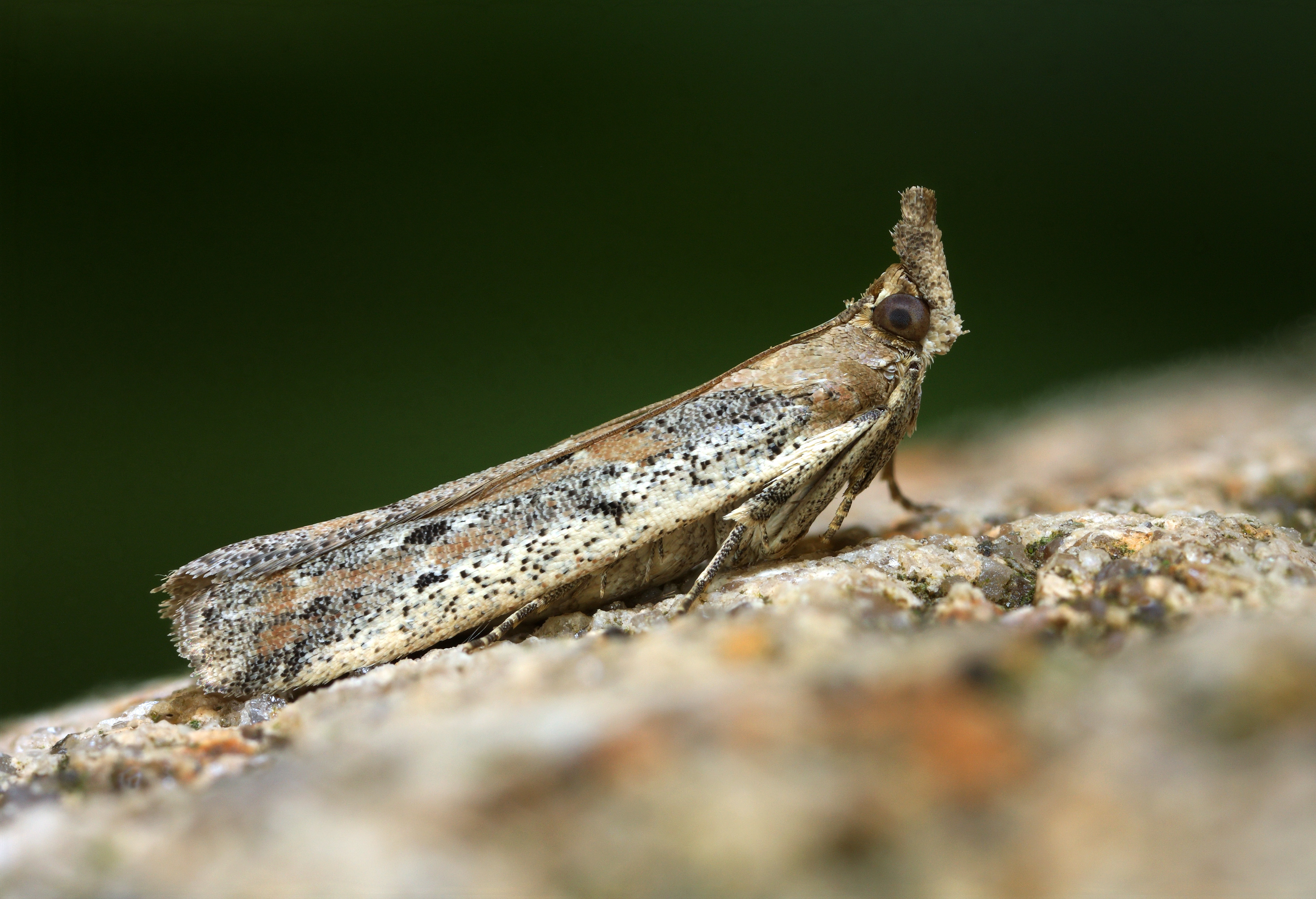
- Gymnancyla canella

Scientific classification
- Kingdom: Animalia
- Phylum: Arthropoda
- Clade: Pancrustacea
- Class: Insecta
- Order: Lepidoptera
- Family: Pyralidae
- Tribe: Phycitini
- Genus: Gymnancyla; Zeller, 1848

Synonyms
- Dentinodia Ragonot, 1887; Dentinosa Caradja in Caradja & Meyrick, 1937; Gynancycla Wocke, 1871; Nefertitia Gozmány, 1960; Spermatophthora Lederer, 1852; Spermatophora Caradja, 1899; Spermatopthora Hulst, 1887

= Gymnancyla =

Genus of moths

Gymnancyla is a genus of snout moths. It was described by Philipp Christoph Zeller in 1848.

== Species ==
- Subgenus Gymnancyla
  - Gymnancyla canella (Denis & Schiffermüller, 1775)
  - Gymnancyla sfakesella Chrétien, 1911
- Subgenus Spermatophthora Lederer, 1852
  - Gymnancyla hornigii (Lederer, 1852)
- Subgenus Dentinodia Ragonot, 1887
  - Gymnancyla craticulella (Ragonot, 1887)
- Unknown subgenus
  - Gymnancyla barbatella Erschoff, 1874
  - Gymnancyla ruscinonella (Ragonot, 1888)
