= Anchylobela phaulodes =

Scientific classification
- Kingdom: Animalia
- Phylum: Arthropoda
- Class: Insecta
- Order: Lepidoptera
- Family: Pyralidae
- Genus: Anchylobela
- Species: A. phaulodes

Binomial name
- Anchylobela phaulodes (Turner, 1947)

Synonyms
- Lioprosopa phaulodes Turner, 1947

Species of moth

Anchylobela phaulodes is a species of snout moth in the genus Anchylobela. It was described by Alfred Jefferis Turner in 1947, and is known from Queensland, Australia.
