= Lioprosopa rhantista =

Scientific classification
- Kingdom: Animalia
- Phylum: Arthropoda
- Class: Insecta
- Order: Lepidoptera
- Family: Pyralidae
- Genus: Lioprosopa
- Species: L. rhantista

Binomial name
- Lioprosopa rhantista Turner, 1947

Species of moth

Lioprosopa rhantista is a species of snout moth in the genus Lioprosopa. It was described by Turner in 1947, and is known from Australia.
