= Anerastia incarnata =

Scientific classification
- Kingdom: Animalia
- Phylum: Arthropoda
- Clade: Pancrustacea
- Class: Insecta
- Order: Lepidoptera
- Family: Pyralidae
- Genus: Anerastia
- Species: A. incarnata

Binomial name
- Anerastia incarnata Staudinger, 1879

Species of moth

Anerastia incarnata is a species of snout moth in the genus Anerastia. It was described by Staudinger, 1879. It is found on Sicily.
