= Homosassa platella =

Scientific classification
- Kingdom: Animalia
- Phylum: Arthropoda
- Class: Insecta
- Order: Lepidoptera
- Family: Pyralidae
- Genus: Homosassa
- Species: H. platella

Binomial name
- Homosassa platella J. C. Shaffer, 1968

Species of moth

Homosassa platella is a species of snout moth in the genus Homosassa. It was described by Jay C. Shaffer in 1968. It is found in North America, including Florida and Mississippi.
