= Homosassa blanchardi =

Scientific classification
- Kingdom: Animalia
- Phylum: Arthropoda
- Class: Insecta
- Order: Lepidoptera
- Family: Pyralidae
- Genus: Homosassa
- Species: H. blanchardi

Binomial name
- Homosassa blanchardi J. C. Shaffer, 1976

Synonyms
- Rhinaphe blanchardi

Species of moth

Homosassa blanchardi is a species of snout moth in the genus Homosassa. It was described by Jay C. Shaffer in 1976. It was described from the US state of Texas.

The forewings are dark brown.
