= Hypsotropa purpurella =

Scientific classification
- Domain: Eukaryota
- Kingdom: Animalia
- Phylum: Arthropoda
- Class: Insecta
- Order: Lepidoptera
- Family: Pyralidae
- Genus: Hypsotropa
- Species: H. purpurella

Binomial name
- Hypsotropa purpurella Hampson, 1918

Species of moth

Hypsotropa purpurella is a species of snout moth in the genus Hypsotropa. It was described by George Hampson in 1918 and is known from central Africa.
