= Baptotropa =

Scientific classification
- Kingdom: Animalia
- Phylum: Arthropoda
- Clade: Pancrustacea
- Class: Insecta
- Order: Lepidoptera
- Family: Pyralidae
- Tribe: Anerastiini
- Genus: Baptotropa; Hampson, 1918
- Species: B. tricolorella

Binomial name
- Baptotropa tricolorella (Hampson, 1899)

Synonyms
- Patna tricolorella Hampson, 1899

Genus of moths

Baptotropa is a monotypic genus of snout moths. It was described by George Hampson in 1918 and contains the species Baptotropa tricolorella. It is found in Assam, India.
