= Anerastia flaveolella =

Scientific classification
- Domain: Eukaryota
- Kingdom: Animalia
- Phylum: Arthropoda
- Class: Insecta
- Order: Lepidoptera
- Family: Pyralidae
- Genus: Anerastia
- Species: A. flaveolella

Binomial name
- Anerastia flaveolella Ragonot, 1887

Species of moth

Anerastia flaveolella is a species of snout moth in the genus Anerastia. It was described by Émile Louis Ragonot in 1887. It is found in South Africa.
