= Acritonia =

Scientific classification
- Kingdom: Animalia
- Phylum: Arthropoda
- Clade: Pancrustacea
- Class: Insecta
- Order: Lepidoptera
- Family: Pyralidae
- Subfamily: Phycitinae
- Genus: Acritonia; Amsel, 1954
- Species: A. comeella

Binomial name
- Acritonia comeella Amsel, 1954

Genus of moths

Acritonia is a monotypic snout moth genus in the subfamily Phycitinae. It was described by Hans Georg Amsel in 1954 It contains the species Acritonia comeella, which is known from Iran.
