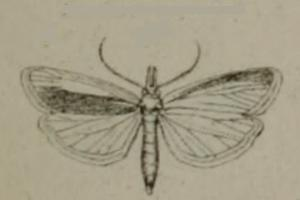

Scientific classification
- Kingdom: Animalia
- Phylum: Arthropoda
- Class: Insecta
- Order: Lepidoptera
- Family: Pyralidae
- Genus: Hypsotropa
- Species: H. ichorella

Binomial name
- Hypsotropa ichorella (Lederer, 1855)

Synonyms
- Anerastia ichorella Lederer, 1855

= Hypsotropa ichorella =

Species of moth

Hypsotropa ichorella is a species of snout moth in the genus Hypsotropa. It was described by Julius Lederer in 1855. It is found in Syria and Turkey.
