= Anacostia (moth) =

Scientific classification
- Kingdom: Animalia
- Phylum: Arthropoda
- Class: Insecta
- Order: Lepidoptera
- Family: Pyralidae
- Tribe: Anerastiini
- Genus: Anacostia; J. C. Shaffer, 1968
- Species: A. tribulella

Binomial name
- Anacostia tribulella J. C. Shaffer, 1968

Genus of moths

Anacostia is a genus of snout moths. It was described by Jay C. Shaffer in 1968 and contains the species Anacostia tribulella. It is found in North America, including Virginia.
