= Menuthia =

Scientific classification
- Kingdom: Animalia
- Phylum: Arthropoda
- Class: Insecta
- Order: Lepidoptera
- Family: Pyralidae
- Subfamily: Phycitinae
- Genus: Menuthia; Ragonot, 1888
- Species: M. nanella

Binomial name
- Menuthia nanella Ragonot, 1888

Genus of moths

Menuthia is a monotypic snout moth genus described by Émile Louis Ragonot in 1888. Its only species, described in the same publication, Menuthia nanella, is found in Tanzania.
