= Pierre Chrétien =

French entomologist (1846–1934)

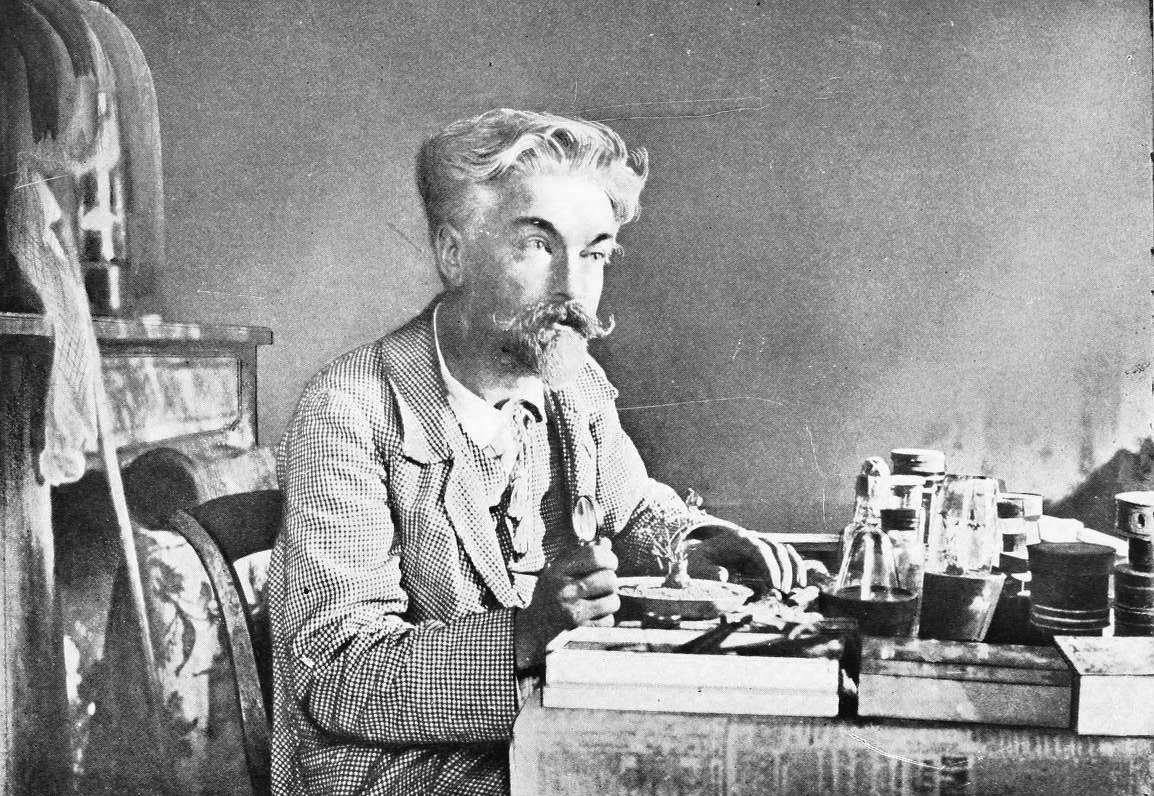
Pierre Chrétien in 1914

Pierre Chrétien (1846 – 15 June 1934, in Nay, Pyrénées-Atlantiques) was a French entomologist who specialised in Lepidoptera. He was a member of Société entomologique de France. Trifurcula chretieni Z. & A. Lastuvka & van Nieukerken, 2013 is "named in honour of Pierre Chrétien (1846–1934), who discovered nepticulid mines on Bupleurum, including those on Bupleurum rigidum, and the first author to describe a number of Mediterranean species that are now placed in Trifurcula (Glaucolepis)." His collection is held by National Museum of Natural History in Paris.

== Works ==
Partial list

- Chrétien, P. (1899). "Description d'un nouveau genre et d'une nouvelle espèce de Microlépidoptère". Bulletin de la Société entomologique de France. 1899: 206.
- ————— (1900). "Les Coleophora du Dorycnium". Naturaliste. 1900: 68–70.
- ————— (1901). "Description d'une nouvelle espèce de Teleia [Microlep.]". Bulletin de la Société entomologique de France. 1901: 10–12.
- ————— (1907). "Description de nouvelles espèces de Lépidoptères d'Algerie". Bulletin de la Société Entomologique de France. 18: 305–308.
- ————— (1915). "Contribution à la connaissance des Lépidoptères du Nord de l'Afrique. Notes biologiques et criques". Annales de la Société Entomologique de France. 84: 289–374.
- ————— (1917). "Contribution à la connaissance des Lépidoptères du Nord de l'Afrique". Annales de la Société Entomologique de France. 85: 369–502.

== See also ==
- Category:Taxa named by Pierre Chrétien
