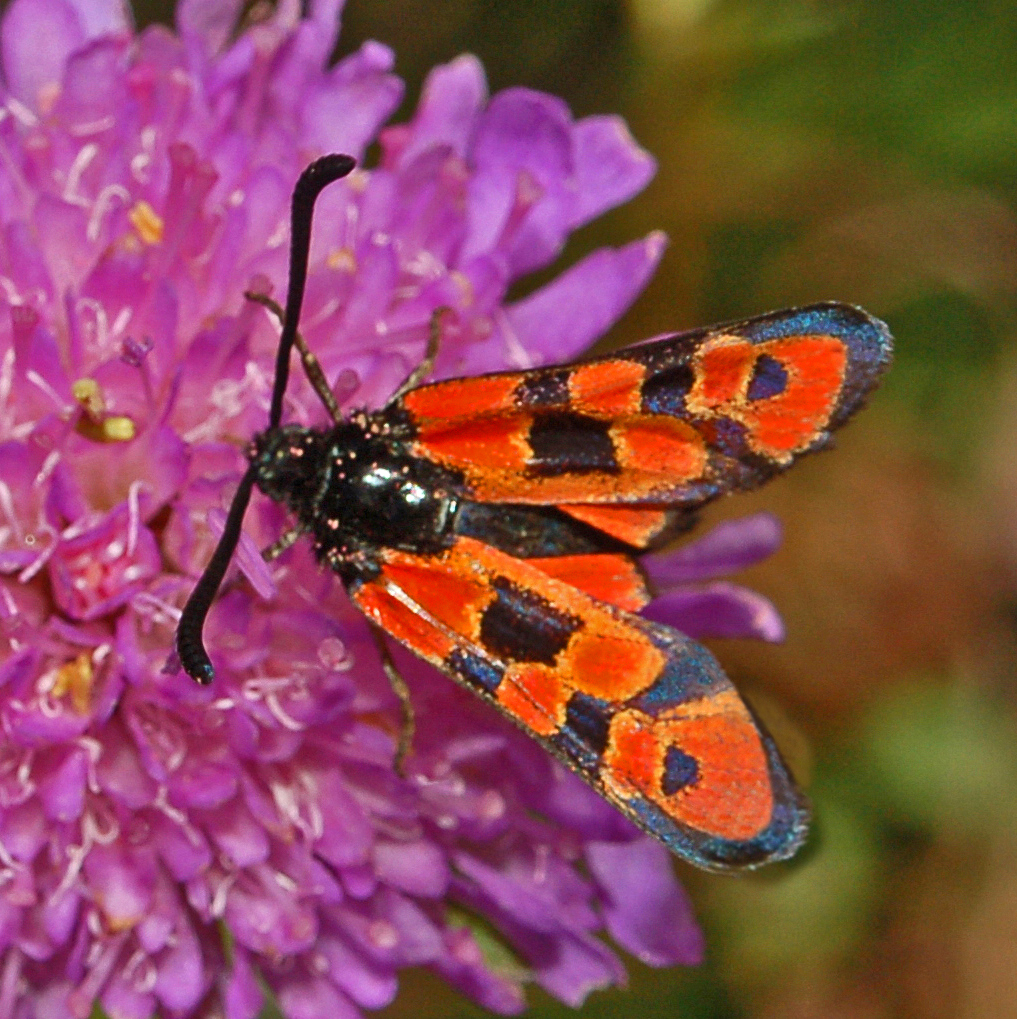

Scientific classification
- Domain: Eukaryota
- Kingdom: Animalia
- Phylum: Arthropoda
- Class: Insecta
- Order: Lepidoptera
- Family: Zygaenidae
- Genus: Zygaena
- Species: Z. hilaris

Binomial name
- Zygaena hilaris Ochsenheimer, 1808

Synonyms
- Zygaena hilaris nigriventris Leraut, 2012

= Zygaena hilaris =

Species of moth

Zygaena hilaris is a species of moth in the family Zygaenidae.

== Subspecies ==
Subspecies include:

- Zygaena hilaris hilaris
- Zygaena hilaris chrysophaea Le Charles, 1934
- Zygaena hilaris escorialensis Oberthur, 1884
- Zygaena hilaris galliae Oberthur, 1910
- Zygaena hilaris leonica Tremewan, 1961
- Zygaena hilaris lucifera Reiss, 1936
- Zygaena hilaris ononidis Milliere, 1878
- Zygaena hilaris piemontica Reiss, 1941

The subspecies Zygaena hilaris chrysophaea is present in France from Vaucluse, Alpes-de-Haute-Provence, Drôme and Hautes-Alpes to Isère.

== Distribution and habitat ==
This species can be found in France, Spain, Portugal and Italy. These moths inhabit dry meadow, edges of calcareous grasslands, dry shrub, sunny slopes and clearings in dry forests, from sea level to 2000 meters.

== Description ==
Zygaena hilaris has a wingspan of 24–25 millimetres (0.94–0.98 in). These moths are polymorphous. Forewings show a black background, with five large red stains usually joined together and often surrounded by ocher-orange rings. Hindwings are entirely red with a thin black line at the outer edge. The body is black except for an ocher slightly marked prothoracic necklace. The caterpillars are hairy, greenish- yellow with rows of small black spots. This species is rather similar to Zygaena fausta, which has an abdominal ring.

== Technical description and variation ==
Zygaena hilaris Ochs. (7i). is as small as or even smaller than formosa. The red colour predominates so much that it occupies the whole fore-wing, there remaining only small black dots. which are sometimes confluent, but are often reduced to dots standing widely separate. The red collar is never present; however, sometimes there are yellowish white hairs at the edge of the thorax. Common at the Riviera and the South-East Coast of Spain. From Digne, in the Basses Alpes. I have before me a pale yellow aberration belonging to the Tring Museum: the figure (7i) bears the name pallida [Zygaena hilaris ssp. chrysophaea Le Charles, [1934]], however I do not consider it necessarv to give here names to such pale yellow aberrations, if they have not already received names. — In ononidis Mill. [ Z. hilaris ssp. ononidis Millière, 1878], from the French Riviera, the red spots are not separated by yellowish white borders from the black ground. — In escorialensis Oberth. [Zygaena hilaris ssp. escorialensis Oberthür, 1884] (7k), from the Castilian table-land, the wings are more thinly scaled, pale rosy, the black spots are reduced to thinly pale edged dots. - ab. bicolor Oberth. [Zygaena hilaris ssp. galliae Oberthür, 1910] (7k) has no black but only light dots (remnants of the edging), and lastly ab. unicolor Oberth. [Zygaena hilaris ssp. galliae Oberthür, 1910] (7k) in which the wings are uniformly red, being narrowly bordered with black. Larva very short and thick, yellow, anteriorly greenish, with dorso-lateral rows of thick black dots; head brown. In June on Ononis. Pupa brown, in a yellowish grey or brownish wrinkly cocoon. The moths fly especially in the morning till 11 o'clock and again in the afternoon from 4, on dry sunny hills and on the cornfields situated between the mountains. They always whiz about quite low, about 20 cm only above the ground, resting with preference on clusters of Thyme. They vary strongly, Oberthur recording, besides the above-mentioned forms, also aberrations with coffee-brown wings.

== Biology ==
These moths have two generations (bivoltine) from May to July and from August to September. Adults fly from late June to July. The larvae feed on Dorycnium species and on various Ononis species (Ononis repens, Ononis natrix, Ononis pinnata, Ononis minutissima, Ononis aragonensis, Ononis diffusa, Ononis procrens, Ononis speciosa, Ononis spinosa, Ononis arvensis).
