= Bembecia albanensis =

Scientific classification
- Domain: Eukaryota
- Kingdom: Animalia
- Phylum: Arthropoda
- Class: Insecta
- Order: Lepidoptera
- Family: Sesiidae
- Genus: Bembecia
- Species: B. albanensis

Binomial name
- Bembecia albanensis (Rebel, 1918)

Synonyms
- Sesia ichneumoniformis albanensis Rebel, 1918; Sesia albanensis; Sesia corcyrensis Rebel, 1918; Dipsosphecia kalavrytana Sheljuzhko, 1924

Species of moth

Bembecia albanensis is a moth of the family Sesiidae. It is found from most of Europe (except Ireland, Fennoscandia, the Benelux, Portugal, Poland, Ukraine and the Baltic region) to Asia Minor and the Black Sea. It is also found in North Africa.

The wingspan is 14–23 millimetres (0.55–0.91 in).

The larvae feed on Ononis species (including Ononis spinosa, Ononis arvensis, Ononis hircina and Ononis repens) and Psoralea bituminosa. The larvae of ssp. tunetana have been recorded feeding on Hedysarum coronarium.

== Subspecies ==
- Bembecia albanensis albanensis (Europe, Asia Minor)
- Bembecia albanensis kalavrytana (Sheljuzhko, 1924) (Italy, Greece)
- Bembecia albanensis garganica Bertaccini & Fiumi, 2002 (Italy)
- Bembecia albanensis tunetana (Le Cerf, 1920) (Tunisia, Sicily, Corsica, Sardinia, Italy)
