= Rest-harrow =

Rest-harrow may refer to:

- Ononis, a genus of perennial herbs and shrubs, including:
  - Ononis repens, common restharrow
- Aplasta ononaria, a species of moth
