= Bembecia priesneri =

Scientific classification
- Domain: Eukaryota
- Kingdom: Animalia
- Phylum: Arthropoda
- Class: Insecta
- Order: Lepidoptera
- Family: Sesiidae
- Genus: Bembecia
- Species: B. priesneri

Binomial name
- Bembecia priesneri Kallies, Petersen & Riefenstahl, 1998

Species of moth

Bembecia priesneri is a moth of the family Sesiidae. It is found in Turkey (Cappadocia and the Taurus Mountains) and some nearby Dodecanese islands (including Rhodes).

The wingspan is 19–25 mm. Adults are on wing in late August and September.

The larvae feed on the roots of Psoralea bituminosa and Ononis species, including Ononis spinosa.
