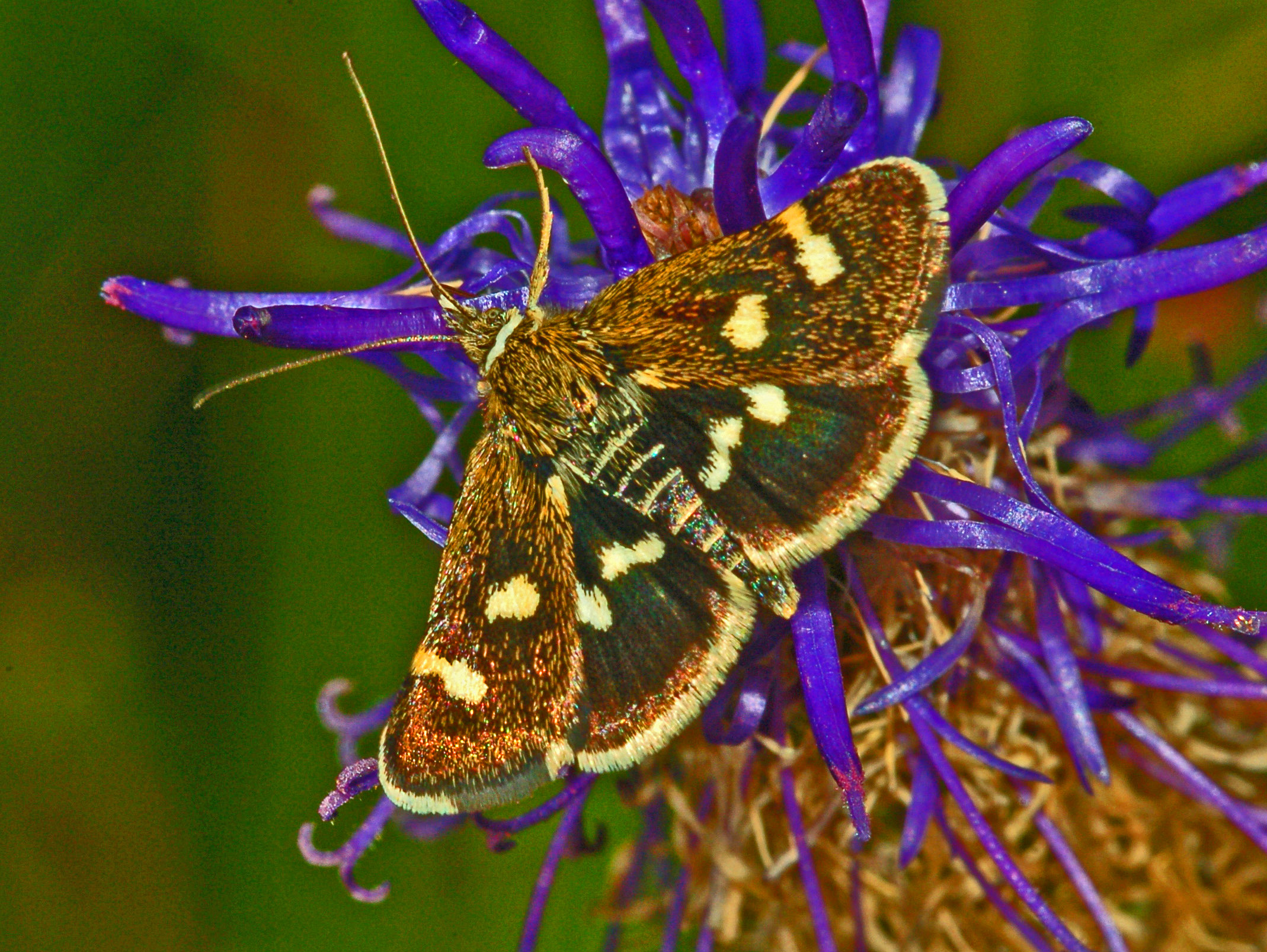

Scientific classification
- Kingdom: Animalia
- Phylum: Arthropoda
- Clade: Pancrustacea
- Class: Insecta
- Order: Lepidoptera
- Family: Crambidae
- Genus: Eurrhypis
- Species: E. pollinalis

Binomial name
- Eurrhypis pollinalis (Denis & Schiffermüller, 1775)

Synonyms
- Pyralis pollinalis Denis & Schiffermüller, 1775; Phalaena Noctua bigutta Esper, 1791; Ennychia melissalis Walker, 1859; Eurrhypis pollinalis pollinalis f. obcaecatalis Leraut & Luquet, 1985; Eurrhypis pollinalis filialis (Zerny, 1934); Eurrhypis flavinotalis Grote, 1881; Eurrhypis pollinalis rungsi Leraut & Luquet, 1983

= Eurrhypis pollinalis =

Species of moth

Eurrhypis pollinalis is a species of moth of the family Crambidae. It was described by Michael Denis and Ignaz Schiffermüller in 1775.

== Description ==
The wingspan is 28–33 mm. The forewings and hindwings are dark brown to almost black. On the forewing there are two large white spots. The hindwings show one white spot and a short streak, but they are smaller than the markings of the forewing. Both wings are lined with white on the outer edge. These moths fly in the sun during the day from April to August depending on the location, with two overlapping generations per year. They overwinter as a caterpillar.

The caterpillars feed on a restricted range of legumes (Fabaceae), such as broom (Genista), liquorice (Glycyrrhiza), Laburnum anagyroides, Cytisus scoparius and Ononis repens.

== Distribution ==
This species is present in southern and central Europe.

== Habitat ==
These moths prefer warm, sunny locations in open countryside. In the mountains they live up to an elevation of 1500 meters.
