= Bembecia iberica =

Scientific classification
- Domain: Eukaryota
- Kingdom: Animalia
- Phylum: Arthropoda
- Class: Insecta
- Order: Lepidoptera
- Family: Sesiidae
- Genus: Bembecia
- Species: B. iberica

Binomial name
- Bembecia iberica Spatenka, 1992

Species of moth

Bembecia iberica is a moth of the family Sesiidae. It is found in France, Spain, Portugal and Italy and on Corsica and Sardinia.

The wingspan is 19–21 mm.

The larvae feed on Lotus, Hippocrepis, Tetragonolobus, Anthyllis vulneraria, Melilotus, Ononis viscosa and Onobrychis. They feed on the roots of their host plant.
