= Bembecia handiensis =

Scientific classification
- Domain: Eukaryota
- Kingdom: Animalia
- Phylum: Arthropoda
- Class: Insecta
- Order: Lepidoptera
- Family: Sesiidae
- Genus: Bembecia
- Species: B. handiensis

Binomial name
- Bembecia handiensis Ramisch, 1997

Species of moth

Bembecia handiensis is a moth of the family Sesiidae. It is found on the Canary Islands and the Atlantic coast of Morocco.

The wingspan is 21–23 mm.

The larvae bore the roots of Ononis natrix, Lotus lancerotensis and Lotus creticus.
