= Marasmarcha oxydactylus =

Scientific classification
- Domain: Eukaryota
- Kingdom: Animalia
- Phylum: Arthropoda
- Class: Insecta
- Order: Lepidoptera
- Family: Pterophoridae
- Genus: Marasmarcha
- Species: M. oxydactylus

Binomial name
- Marasmarcha oxydactylus (Staudinger, 1859)

Synonyms
- Pterophorus oxydactylus Staudinger, 1859; Marasmarcha wullschlegeli Müller-Rutz, 1914

Species of plume moth

Marasmarcha oxydactylus is a moth of the family Pterophoridae. It is found in Spain, Portugal, Switzerland, Austria France and Italy. In Europe, the northern limit of the range are the Austrian Alps. It is also found in North Africa.

The wingspan is 18–23 mm.

The larvae feed on round-leaved restharrow (Ononis rotundifolia).
