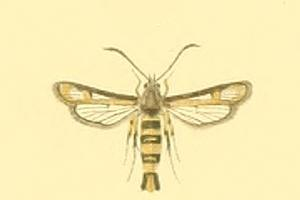

Scientific classification
- Domain: Eukaryota
- Kingdom: Animalia
- Phylum: Arthropoda
- Class: Insecta
- Order: Lepidoptera
- Family: Sesiidae
- Genus: Bembecia
- Species: B. flavida

Binomial name
- Bembecia flavida (Oberthur, 1890)

Synonyms
- Sesia flavida Oberthur, 1890; Dipsosphecia sirphiformis Bartel, 1912

= Bembecia flavida =

Species of moth

Bembecia flavida is a moth of the family Sesiidae. It is found on Sicily and in North Africa, including Algeria, Morocco and Tunisia.

The wingspan is 21–22 mm.

The larvae possibly feed on Ononis natrix.
