= Coleophora ononidella =

Scientific classification
- Kingdom: Animalia
- Phylum: Arthropoda
- Class: Insecta
- Order: Lepidoptera
- Family: Coleophoridae
- Genus: Coleophora
- Species: C. ononidella

Binomial name
- Coleophora ononidella Millière, 1879

Species of moth

Coleophora ononidella is a moth of the family Coleophoridae. It is found south of the line running from France to Cyprus.

The larvae feed on Ononis arvensis, Ononis spinosa and Ononis spinosa antiquorum. Larvae can be found from March to May.
