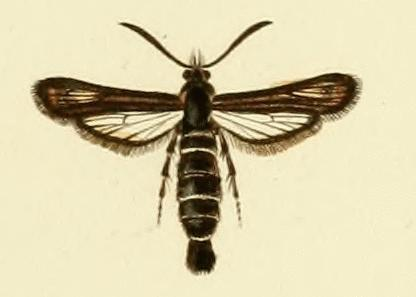
- Female
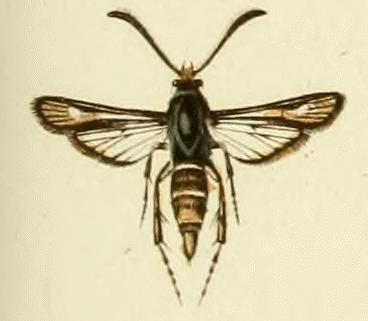
- Male

Scientific classification
- Domain: Eukaryota
- Kingdom: Animalia
- Phylum: Arthropoda
- Class: Insecta
- Order: Lepidoptera
- Family: Sesiidae
- Genus: Bembecia
- Species: B. hymenopteriformis

Binomial name
- Bembecia hymenopteriformis (Bellier, 1860)

Synonyms
- Sesia hymenopteriformis Bellier, 1860; Sesia hymenopteriformis var. algeriensis Le Cerf, 1911; Dipsosphecia hymenopteriformis var. luticornis Mariani, 1937; Sesia hymenopteriformis ab. ducellieri Le Cerf, 1911; Dipsosphecia hymenopteriformis ab. fulvusororcula Zukowsky, 1936

= Bembecia hymenopteriformis =

Species of moth

Bembecia hymenopteriformis is a moth of the family Sesiidae. It occurs in the Mediterranean Europe (Spain, mainland Italy, Sicily, Corsica) and in North Africa (Morocco, Algeria, Tunisia).

== Description ==
The wingspan is highly variable, 12–26 mm. The larvae feed on Anthyllis (including Anthyllis vulneraria) and Lotus species (including Lotus creticus and Lotus corniculatus).
