= Ononis sieberi =

Scientific classification
- Kingdom: Plantae
- Clade: Tracheophytes
- Clade: Angiosperms
- Clade: Eudicots
- Clade: Rosids
- Order: Fabales
- Family: Fabaceae
- Subfamily: Faboideae
- Genus: Ononis
- Species: O. sieberi

Binomial name
- Ononis sieberi (DC.)Sirj.

Synonyms
- Ononis viscosa subsp. sieberi

Species of plant

Ononis sieberi is a plant species in the family Fabaceae.

== Sources ==
This article incorporates text from a free content work. Licensed under CC0 (license statement/permission). Text taken from Ononis sieberi. Encyclopedia of Life.
