= Bembecia staryi =

Scientific classification
- Domain: Eukaryota
- Kingdom: Animalia
- Phylum: Arthropoda
- Class: Insecta
- Order: Lepidoptera
- Family: Sesiidae
- Genus: Bembecia
- Species: B. staryi

Binomial name
- Bembecia staryi Špatenka & Gorbunov, 1992

Species of moth

Bembecia staryi is a moth of the family Sesiidae. It is found in the Kaçkar Mountains in Georgia and Turkey.
