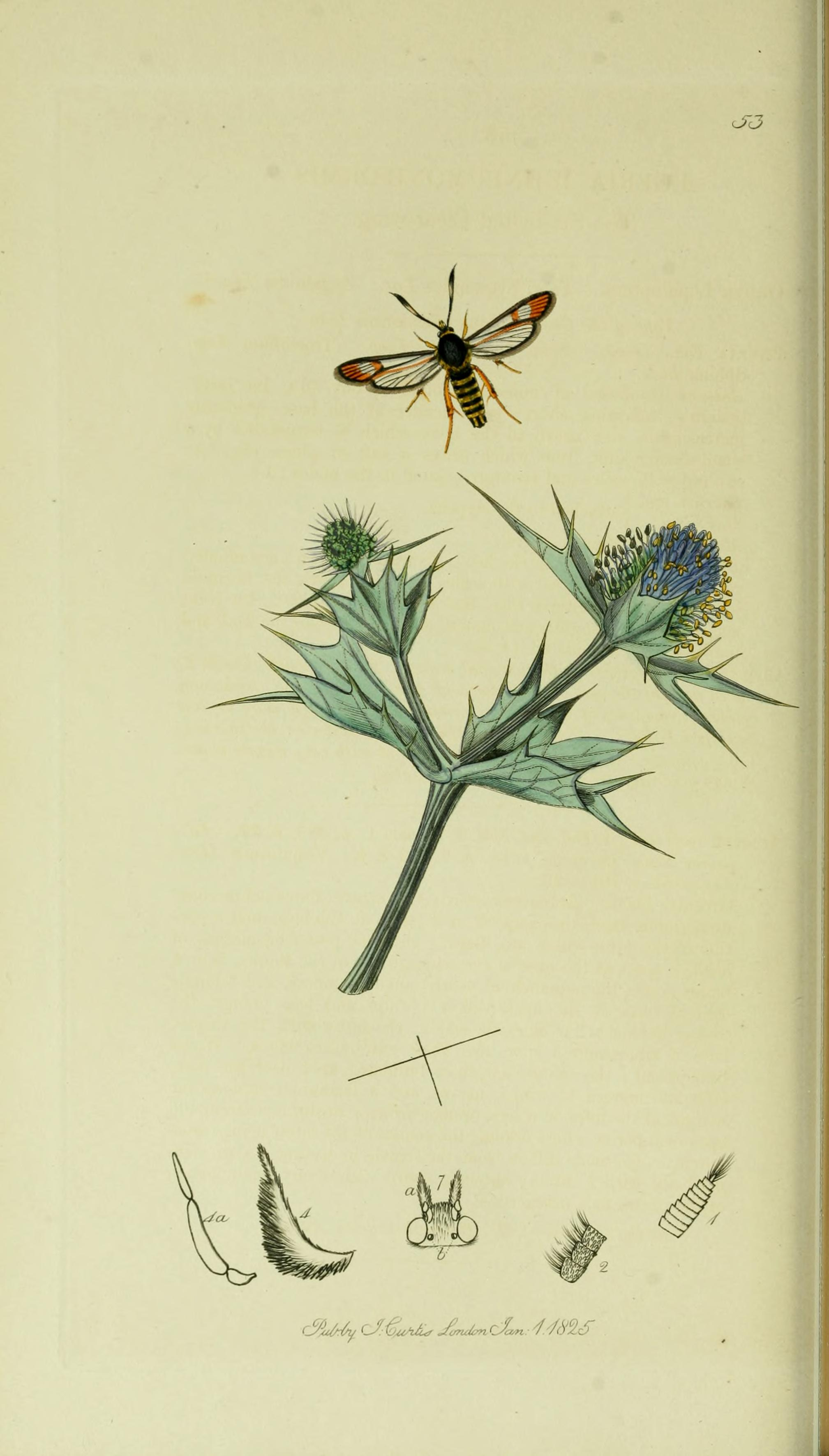

Scientific classification
- Kingdom: Animalia
- Phylum: Arthropoda
- Clade: Pancrustacea
- Class: Insecta
- Order: Lepidoptera
- Family: Sesiidae
- Genus: Bembecia
- Species: B. scopigera

Binomial name
- Bembecia scopigera (Scopoli, 1763)

Synonyms
- Sphinx scopigera Scopoli, 1763; Dipsosphecia communis Le Cerf, 1920; Bembecia mira Gorbunov & Špatenka, 2001; Sesia scopigera ab. lugubris Staudinger, 1871

= Bembecia scopigera =

Species of moth

Bembecia scopigera, the six-belted clearwing, is a moth of the family Sesiidae. It is found from central Spain over most of south-western and central Europe, the Balkans, Greece, southern Russia and Ukraine to Turkey.

The wingspan is 24–25 mm.

The larvae feed on the roots of Onobrychis species, including Onobrychis sativa, Onobrychis viciinifolia and Onobrychis toumefortii species. Other records include Lotus species and Anthyllis vulneraria.
