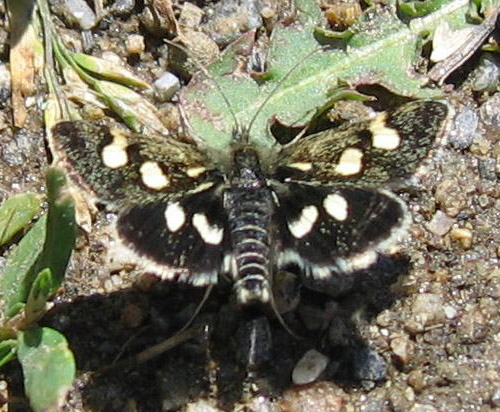
- E. pollinalis

Scientific classification
- Domain: Eukaryota
- Kingdom: Animalia
- Phylum: Arthropoda
- Class: Insecta
- Order: Lepidoptera
- Family: Crambidae
- Tribe: Eurrhypini
- Genus: Eurrhypis; Hübner, 1825

Synonyms
- Threnodes Duponchel, 1845

= Eurrhypis =

Genus of moths

Eurrhypis is a genus of moths of the family Crambidae.

== Species ==
- Eurrhypis cacuminalis (Eversmann, 1843)
- Eurrhypis guttulalis (Herrich-Schäffer, 1848)
- Eurrhypis pollinalis (Denis & Schiffermüller, 1775)
- Eurrhypis sartalis (Hübner, 1813)
