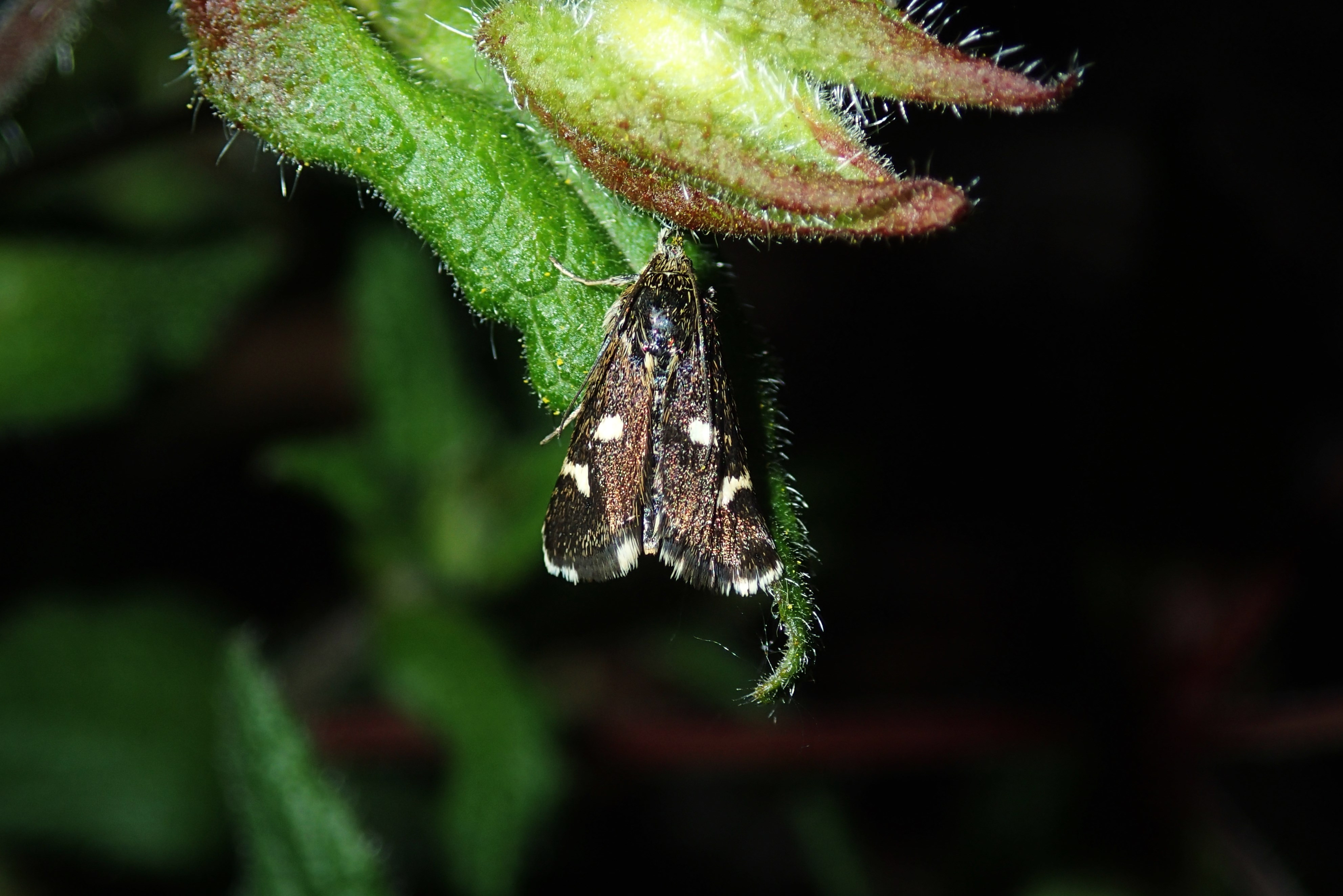

Scientific classification
- Domain: Eukaryota
- Kingdom: Animalia
- Phylum: Arthropoda
- Class: Insecta
- Order: Lepidoptera
- Family: Crambidae
- Genus: Eurrhypis
- Species: E. guttulalis

Binomial name
- Eurrhypis guttulalis (Herrich-Schaffer, 1848)

Synonyms
- Hercyna guttulalis Herrich-Schaffer, 1848; Eurrhypis guttulalis corsicalis P. Leraut & Luquet, 1985

= Eurrhypis guttulalis =

Species of moth

Eurrhypis guttulalis is a species of moth in the family Crambidae. It is found in France, Spain, Portugal, Italy, Croatia, Bosnia and Herzegovina, Romania, Bulgaria and Greece.
