= Bembecia blanka =

Scientific classification
- Kingdom: Animalia
- Phylum: Arthropoda
- Clade: Pancrustacea
- Class: Insecta
- Order: Lepidoptera
- Family: Sesiidae
- Genus: Bembecia
- Species: B. blanka

Binomial name
- Bembecia blanka Spatenka, 2001

Species of moth

Bembecia blanka is a moth of the family Sesiidae. It is found on the Greek island of Crete.

It is the smallest European species of the genus Bembecia.

The larvae possibly feed on Trifolium species.
