= Ononis oligophylla =

Scientific classification
- Kingdom: Plantae
- Clade: Tracheophytes
- Clade: Angiosperms
- Clade: Eudicots
- Clade: Rosids
- Order: Fabales
- Family: Fabaceae
- Subfamily: Faboideae
- Genus: Ononis
- Species: O. oligophylla

Binomial name
- Ononis oligophylla Ten.

Species of plant

Ononis oligophylla is a species of plants in the family Fabaceae.

== Sources ==
This article incorporates text from a free content work. Licensed under CC0 (license statement/permission). Text taken from Ononis oligophylla. Encyclopedia of Life.
