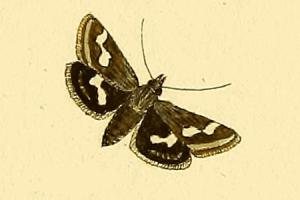

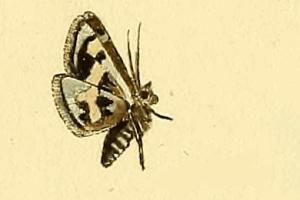

Scientific classification
- Kingdom: Animalia
- Phylum: Arthropoda
- Clade: Pancrustacea
- Class: Insecta
- Order: Lepidoptera
- Family: Crambidae
- Genus: Eurrhypis
- Species: E. sartalis

Binomial name
- Eurrhypis sartalis (Hubner, 1813)

Synonyms
- Pyralis sartalis Hubner, 1813

= Eurrhypis sartalis =

Species of moth

Eurrhypis sartalis is a species of moth in the family Crambidae. It is found in Russia.
