= Bembecia sanguinolenta =

Scientific classification
- Domain: Eukaryota
- Kingdom: Animalia
- Phylum: Arthropoda
- Class: Insecta
- Order: Lepidoptera
- Family: Sesiidae
- Genus: Bembecia
- Species: B. sanguinolenta

Binomial name
- Bembecia sanguinolenta (Lederer, 1853)

Synonyms
- Sesia sanguinolenta Lederer, 1853; Sesia tengyraeformis Herrich-Schäffer, 1851 (preocc.); Sciapteron sanguinolenta var. ponticum Staudinger, 1891; Sciapteron splendidum Staudinger, 1891; Dipsosphecia sanguinolenta f. miranda Le Cerf, 1914

Species of moth

Bembecia sanguinolenta is a moth of the family Sesiidae. It is found from Bulgaria and Greece to Asia Minor, Armenia, Syria and Turkmenistan.

The larvae feed on the roots of Astragalus species, including Astragalus dipsaceus and Astragalus pinetorum.

== Subspecies ==
- Bembecia sanguinolenta sanguinolenta
- Bembecia sanguinolenta turcmena (Bartel, 1912)

== Taxonomy ==
Populations in Turkey and Syria have long been treated as Bembecia pontica, which is now considered a synonym.
