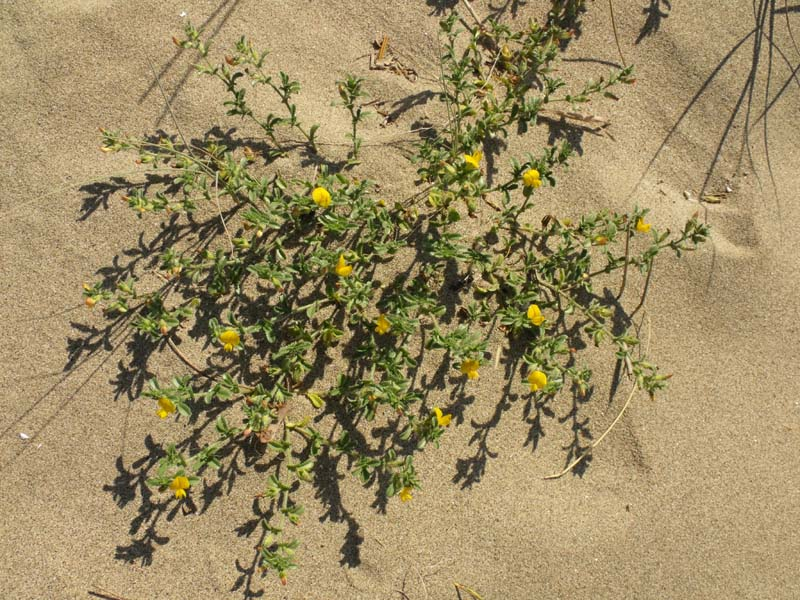

Scientific classification
- Kingdom: Plantae
- Clade: Tracheophytes
- Clade: Angiosperms
- Clade: Eudicots
- Clade: Rosids
- Order: Fabales
- Family: Fabaceae
- Subfamily: Faboideae
- Genus: Ononis
- Species: O. variegata

Binomial name
- Ononis variegata L.

Synonyms
- Ononis euphrasiifolia

= Ononis variegata =

Species of plant

Ononis variegata is a species of plant in the legume family Fabaceae.
