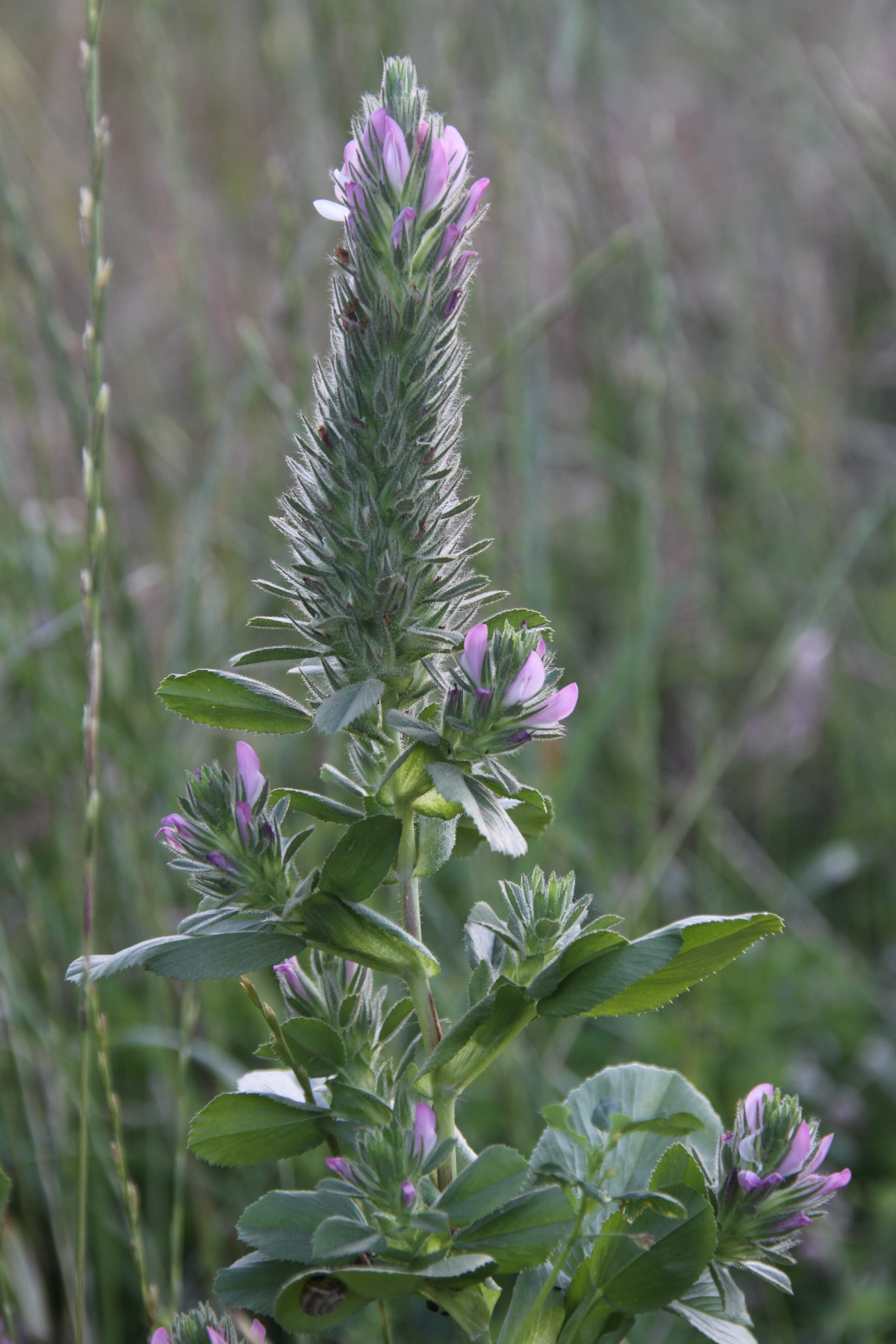

Scientific classification
- Kingdom: Plantae
- Clade: Tracheophytes
- Clade: Angiosperms
- Clade: Eudicots
- Clade: Rosids
- Order: Fabales
- Family: Fabaceae
- Subfamily: Faboideae
- Genus: Ononis
- Species: O. alopecuroides

Binomial name
- Ononis alopecuroides L.

Synonyms
- Ononis baetica

= Ononis alopecuroides =

Species of plant

Ononis alopecuroides is a plant species in the family Fabaceae

== Sources ==
This article incorporates text from a free content work. Licensed under CC0 (license statement/permission). Text taken from Ononis alopecuroides. Encyclopedia of Life.
