= Bembecia sareptana =

Scientific classification
- Domain: Eukaryota
- Kingdom: Animalia
- Phylum: Arthropoda
- Class: Insecta
- Order: Lepidoptera
- Family: Sesiidae
- Genus: Bembecia
- Species: B. sareptana

Binomial name
- Bembecia sareptana (Bartel, 1912)

Synonyms
- Dipsosphecia sareptana Bartel, 1912

Species of moth

Bembecia sareptana is a moth of the family Sesiidae. It is found in Russia (it was described from Sarepta).

The larvae possibly feed on Alhagi camelorum.
