= Bembecia syzcjovi =

Scientific classification
- Domain: Eukaryota
- Kingdom: Animalia
- Phylum: Arthropoda
- Class: Insecta
- Order: Lepidoptera
- Family: Sesiidae
- Genus: Bembecia
- Species: B. syzcjovi

Binomial name
- Bembecia syzcjovi Gorbunov, 1990

Species of moth

Bembecia syzcjovi is a moth of the family Sesiidae. It is found in Turkey, Georgia and Iran.

Adults are on wing in late August and September.

The larvae feed on the roots of Astragalus species, including Astragalus ponticus.

== Subspecies ==
- Bembecia syzcjovi syzcjovi (Turkey, Georgia)
- Bembecia syzcjovi kappadocica Špatenka, 1997 (Turkish Kappadocia)
- Bembecia syzcjovi alborzica Kallies & Špatenka, 2003 (Iran)
