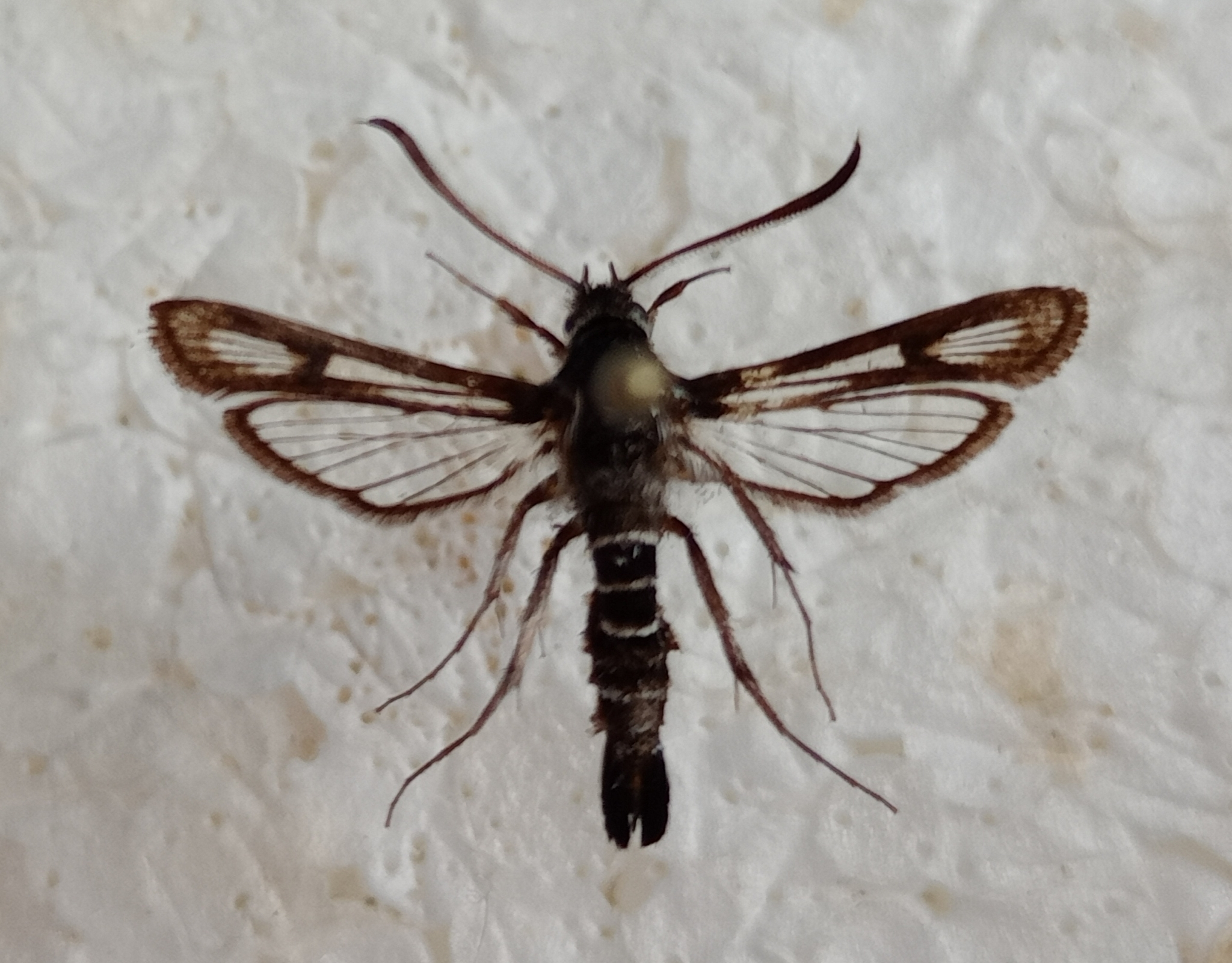

Scientific classification
- Domain: Eukaryota
- Kingdom: Animalia
- Phylum: Arthropoda
- Class: Insecta
- Order: Lepidoptera
- Family: Sesiidae
- Genus: Bembecia
- Species: B. vulcanica

Binomial name
- Bembecia vulcanica (Pinker, 1969)

Synonyms
- Dipsosphecia vulcanica Pinker, 1969

= Bembecia vulcanica =

Species of moth

Bembecia vulcanica is a species of moth in the family Sesiidae. It is found on the Canary Islands.

The wingspan is about 22 mm.

The larvae feed on the flowers of Lotus campylocladus, Lotus hillebrandii and Psoralea bituminosa.
