= Bembecia abromeiti =

Scientific classification
- Kingdom: Animalia
- Phylum: Arthropoda
- Clade: Pancrustacea
- Class: Insecta
- Order: Lepidoptera
- Family: Sesiidae
- Genus: Bembecia
- Species: B. abromeiti

Binomial name
- Bembecia abromeiti Kallies & Riefenstahl, 2000

Species of moth

Bembecia abromeiti is a moth of the family Sesiidae. It is found on the Balearic Island of Mallorca.
