= Bembecia psoraleae =

Scientific classification
- Domain: Eukaryota
- Kingdom: Animalia
- Phylum: Arthropoda
- Class: Insecta
- Order: Lepidoptera
- Family: Sesiidae
- Genus: Bembecia
- Species: B. psoraleae

Binomial name
- Bembecia psoraleae Bartsch & Bettag, 1997

Species of moth

Bembecia psoraleae is a moth of the family Sesiidae. It is found in France, Spain, Portugal and Italy.

The wingspan is about 24 mm.

The larvae feed on the roots of Psoralea bituminosa.
