= Bembecia lomatiaeformis =

Scientific classification
- Domain: Eukaryota
- Kingdom: Animalia
- Phylum: Arthropoda
- Class: Insecta
- Order: Lepidoptera
- Family: Sesiidae
- Genus: Bembecia
- Species: B. lomatiaeformis

Binomial name
- Bembecia lomatiaeformis (Lederer, 1853)

Synonyms
- Sesia lomatiaeformis Lederer, 1853; Sciapteron gruneri Staudinger, 1856; Dipsosphecia rothschildi Bartel, 1912; Dipsosphecia lomatiaeformis f. norma Le Cerf, 1914

Species of moth

Bembecia lomatiaeformis is a moth of the family Sesiidae. It is found from Greece to Turkey and the Caucasus.

The wingspan is 28–34 mm.

The larvae feed on the roots of Astragalus species, including Astragalus angustifolius and Astragalus creticus rumelicus.
