= Bembecia fibigeri =

Scientific classification
- Kingdom: Animalia
- Phylum: Arthropoda
- Class: Insecta
- Order: Lepidoptera
- Family: Sesiidae
- Genus: Bembecia
- Species: B. fibigeri

Binomial name
- Bembecia fibigeri Z. Lastuvka & A. Lastuvka, 1994

Species of moth

Bembecia fibigeri is a moth of the family Sesiidae. It is found in southern France and Spain.

The wingspan is about 23 mm.

The larvae feed on Onodis rotundifolia and Onodis fruticosa.
