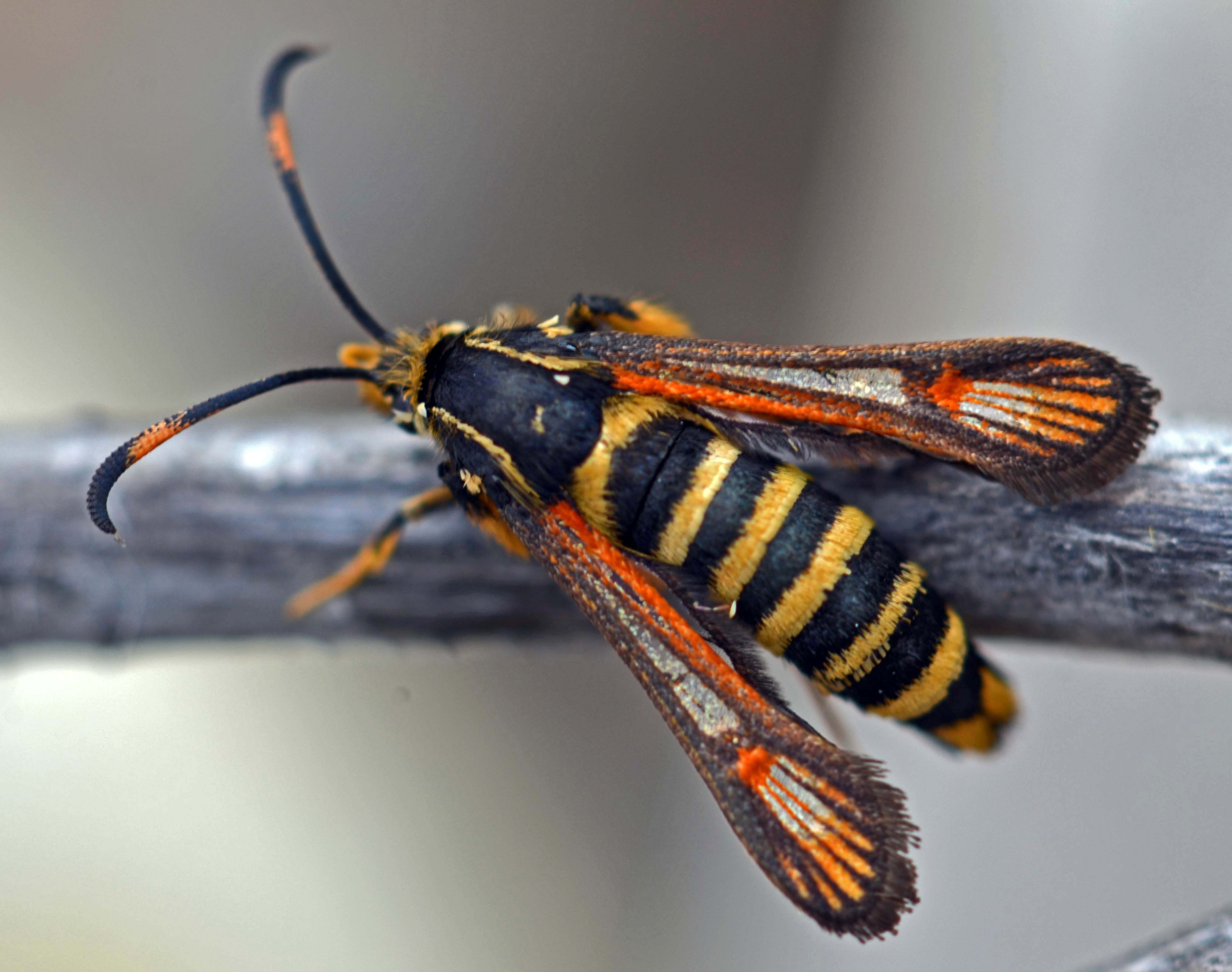
- Bembecia ichneumoniformis

Scientific classification
- Domain: Eukaryota
- Kingdom: Animalia
- Phylum: Arthropoda
- Class: Insecta
- Order: Lepidoptera
- Family: Sesiidae
- Tribe: Synanthedonini
- Genus: Bembecia; Hübner, [1819]

Species
- See text

= Bembecia =

Genus of moths

Bembecia is a genus of moths in the family Sesiidae.

== Species ==
- Bembecia abromeiti Kallies & Riefenstahl, 2000
- Bembecia afghana Bartsch & Špatenka, 2010
- Bembecia alaica (Püngeler, 1912)
- Bembecia albanensis (Rebel, 1918)
  - Bembecia albanensis albanensis (Rebel, 1918)
  - Bembecia albanensis garganica Bertaccini & Fiumi, 2002
  - Bembecia albanensis kalavrytana (Sheljuzhko, 1924)
  - Bembecia albanensis tunetana (Le Cerf, 1920)
- Bembecia aloisi Špatenka, 1997
- Bembecia apyra (Le Cerf, 1937)
  - Bembecia apyra apyra (Le Cerf, 1937)
  - Bembecia apyra johannesi Gorbunov, 1995
- Bembecia auricaudata (Bartel, 1912)
- Bembecia aye Stalling, Altermatt, Lingenhöle & Garrevoet, 2010
- Bembecia balkis (Le Cerf, 1937)
  - Bembecia balkis atrocaudata Wiltshire, 1986
  - Bembecia balkis balkis (Le Cerf, 1937)
- Bembecia barbara (Bartel, 1912)
- Bembecia bartschi Garrevoet & Lingenhöle, 2011
- Bembecia bestianaeli (Capuse, 1973)
- Bembecia blanka Špatenka, 2001
- Bembecia bohatschi (Püngeler, [1905])
- Bembecia buxea Gorbunov, 1989
- Bembecia ceiformis (Staudinger, 1881)
- Bembecia coreacola (Matsumura, 1931)
- Bembecia damascena Spatenka & Pavlicko 2011
- Bembecia deserticola Špatenka, Petersen & Kallies, 1997
- Bembecia dispar (Staudinger, 1891)
- Bembecia elena Spatenka & Bartsch, 2010
- Bembecia fibigeri Laštuvka & Laštuvka, 1994
- Bembecia flavida (Oberthür, 1890)
- Bembecia fokidensis Toševski, 1991
- Bembecia fortis Diakonoff, [1968]
- Bembecia garrevoeti Lingenhöle & Bartsch, 2011
- Bembecia gegamica Gorbunov, 1991
- Bembecia gobica Špatenka & Lingenhöle, 2002
- Bembecia guesnoni Špatenka & Toševski, 1994
- Bembecia handiensis Rämisch, 1997
- Bembecia hedysari Wang & Yang, 1994
- Bembecia himmighoffeni (Staudinger, 1866:51)
- Bembecia hissorensis Stalling, Bartsch, Garrevoet, Lingenhöle & Altermatt, 2011
- Bembecia hofmanni Kallies & Špatenka, 2003
- Bembecia hymenopteriformis (Bellier, 1860)
- Bembecia iberica Špatenka, 1992
- Bembecia ichneumoniformis ([Denis & Schiffermüller], 1775)
- Bembecia igueri Bettag & Bläsius, 1998
- Bembecia illustris (Rebel, 1901)
- Bembecia insidiosa (Le Cerf, 1911)
- Bembecia irina Špatenka, Petersen & Kallies, 1997
- Bembecia jakuta (Herz, 1903)
- Bembecia joesti Bettag, 1997
- Bembecia kaabaki Gorbunov, 2001
- Bembecia karategina Špatenka, 1997
- Bembecia kaszabi (Capuse, 1973)
- Bembecia kreuzbergi Spatenka & Bartsch, 2010
- Bembecia kryzhanovskii Gorbunov, 2001
- Bembecia lamai Kallies, 1996
- Bembecia lasicera (Hampson, 1906)
- Bembecia lastuvkai Spatenka & Bartsch, 2010
- Bembecia lingenhoelei Garrevoet & Garrevoet, 2011
- Bembecia lomatiaeformis (Lederer, 1853)
- Bembecia martensi Gorbunov, 1994
- Bembecia megillaeformis (Hübner, [1808-1813])
  - Bembecia megillaeformis luqueti Špatenka, 1992
  - Bembecia megillaeformis megillaeformis (Hübner, [1808-1813])
- Bembecia molleti Kallies & Špatenka, 2003
- Bembecia montis (Leech, 1889a)
- Bembecia ningxiaensis Xu & Liu, 1998
- Bembecia nivalis Špatenka, 2001
- Bembecia oxytropidis Špatenka & Lingenhöle, 2002
- Bembecia pagesi Toševski, 1993
- Bembecia pamira Špatenka, 1992
- Bembecia parthica (Lederer, 1870)
- Bembecia pashtuna Špatenka, 1997a
- Bembecia pavicevici Toševski, 1989
  - Bembecia pavicevici dobrovskyi Špatenka, 1997
  - Bembecia pavicevici pavicevici Toševski, 1989
- Bembecia peterseni Špatenka, 1997
- Bembecia pogranzona Špatenka, Petersen & Kallies, 1997
- Bembecia polyzona (Püngeler, 1912)
- Bembecia powelli (Le Cerf, 1925)
- Bembecia priesneri Kallies, Petersen & Riefenstahl, 1998
- Bembecia psoraleae Bartsch & Bettag, 1997
- Bembecia puella Laštuvka, 1989
- Bembecia pyronigra Špatenka & Kallies, 2001
- Bembecia rushana Gorbunov, 1992
- Bembecia salangica Špatenka & Reshöft
- Bembecia sanguinolenta (Lederer, 1853)
  - Bembecia sanguinolenta sanguinolenta (Lederer, 1853)
  - Bembecia sanguinolenta transcaucasica (Staudinger, 1891)
- Bembecia sareptana (Bartel, 1912:395)
- Bembecia scopigera (Scopoli, 1763)
- Bembecia senilis (Grum-Grshimailo, 1890)
- Bembecia sinensis (Hampson, 1919)
- Bembecia sirphiformis (Lucas, 1849)
- Bembecia sophoracola Xu & Jin, 1999
- Bembecia staryi Špatenka & Gorbunov, 1992
- Bembecia stiziformis (Herrich-Schäffer, 1851)
  - Bembecia stiziformis belouchistanica Špatenka, 2001
  - Bembecia stiziformis fervida (Lederer, 1855)
  - Bembecia stiziformis stiziformis (Herrich-Schäffer, 1851)
  - Bembecia stiziformis tenebrosa (Püngeler, 1914)
- Bembecia strandi (Kozhantshikov, 1936)
- Bembecia stuebingeri Sobczyk, Kallies & Riefenstahl, 2007
- Bembecia syzcjovi Gorbunov, 1990
  - Bembecia syzcjovi alborzica Kallies & Špatenka, 2003
  - Bembecia syzcjovi kappadocica Špatenka, 1997
  - Bembecia syzcjovi syzcjovi Gorbunov, 1990
- Bembecia tancrei (Püngeler, [1905])
- Bembecia tshatkalensis Spatenka & Kallies, 2006
- Bembecia tshimgana (Sheljuzhko, 1935)
- Bembecia turanica (Erschoff, 1874)
- Bembecia uroceriformis (Treitschke, 1834)
  - Bembecia uroceriformis armoricana (Oberthür, [1907])
  - Bembecia uroceriformis uroceriformis (Treitschke, 1834)
- Bembecia ussuriensis (Gorbunov & Arita, 1995)
- Bembecia vidua (Staudinger, 1889)
- Bembecia viguraea (Püngeler, 1912)
- Bembecia volgensis Gorbunov, 1994c
- Bembecia vulcanica (Pinker, 1969)
- Bembecia zebo Špatenka & Gorbunov, 1992
- Bembecia zonsteini Gorbunov, 1994
