= Bembecia sirphiformis =

Scientific classification
- Domain: Eukaryota
- Kingdom: Animalia
- Phylum: Arthropoda
- Class: Insecta
- Order: Lepidoptera
- Family: Sesiidae
- Genus: Bembecia
- Species: B. sirphiformis

Binomial name
- Bembecia sirphiformis (Lucas, 1849)

Synonyms
- Sesia sirphiformis Lucas, 1849; Dipsosphecia syrphiformis Dalla Torre & Strand, 1925; Sesia astragali de Joannis, 1909

Species of moth

Bembecia sirphiformis is a moth of the family Sesiidae. It is found in France, Spain, Portugal and Italy. It is also found in North Africa.

The wingspan is 26–27 mm.

The larvae feed on Astragalus monspessulanus, Astragalus granatensis, Colutea arborescens and Acanthyllis armata.
