= Bembecia stiziformis =

Scientific classification
- Domain: Eukaryota
- Kingdom: Animalia
- Phylum: Arthropoda
- Class: Insecta
- Order: Lepidoptera
- Family: Sesiidae
- Genus: Bembecia
- Species: B. stiziformis

Binomial name
- Bembecia stiziformis (Herrich-Schaffer, 1851)

Synonyms
- Sesia stiziformis Herrich-Schaffer, 1851; Sciapteron stiziformis var. melasomon Staudinger, 1871; Dipsosphecia stiziformis f. astyages Le Cerf, 1938; Paranthrene barbarossa de Freina, 1983; Paranthrene tubercula de Freina, 1983; Sciapteron fervida var. subfervidum Staudinger 1891; Paranthrene kara de Freina, 1983

Species of moth

Bembecia stiziformis is a moth of the family Sesiidae. It is found on Cyprus and from Turkey to Iran, Turkmenistan and Pakistan.

The larvae feed on the roots of Astragalus species and Tragacanthus aureus, Tragacanthus microcephalus and Tragacanthus zangezurus.

== Subspecies ==
- Bembecia stiziformis stiziformis
- Bembecia stiziformis fervida (Lederer, 1855)
- Bembecia stiziformis tenebrosa (Püngeler, 1914)
- Bembecia stiziformis belouchistanica Špatenka, 2001
