= Bembecia pavicevici =

Scientific classification
- Domain: Eukaryota
- Kingdom: Animalia
- Phylum: Arthropoda
- Class: Insecta
- Order: Lepidoptera
- Family: Sesiidae
- Genus: Bembecia
- Species: B. pavicevici

Binomial name
- Bembecia pavicevici Spatenka, 1997

Species of moth

Bembecia pavicevici is a moth of the family Sesiidae. It is found on the Balkan Peninsula.

The wingspan is 25–26 mm.

The larvae feed on the roots of Coronilla emerus.

== Subspecies ==
- Bembecia pavicevici pavicevici (Istria, Dalmatia, Macedonia, Hvar, Greece)
- Bembecia pavicevici dobrovskyi Špatenka, 1997 (southern Greece)
