= Bembecia volgensis =

Scientific classification
- Domain: Eukaryota
- Kingdom: Animalia
- Phylum: Arthropoda
- Class: Insecta
- Order: Lepidoptera
- Family: Sesiidae
- Genus: Bembecia
- Species: B. volgensis

Binomial name
- Bembecia volgensis Gorbunov, 1994

Species of moth

Bembecia volgensis is a moth of the family Sesiidae. It is found in the Upper Volga region of Russia. The type series was collected on slopes of wet ravines in limestone steppe along the bank of the Volga.

The wingspan is 13–18 mm (0.51–0.71 in) in males.
