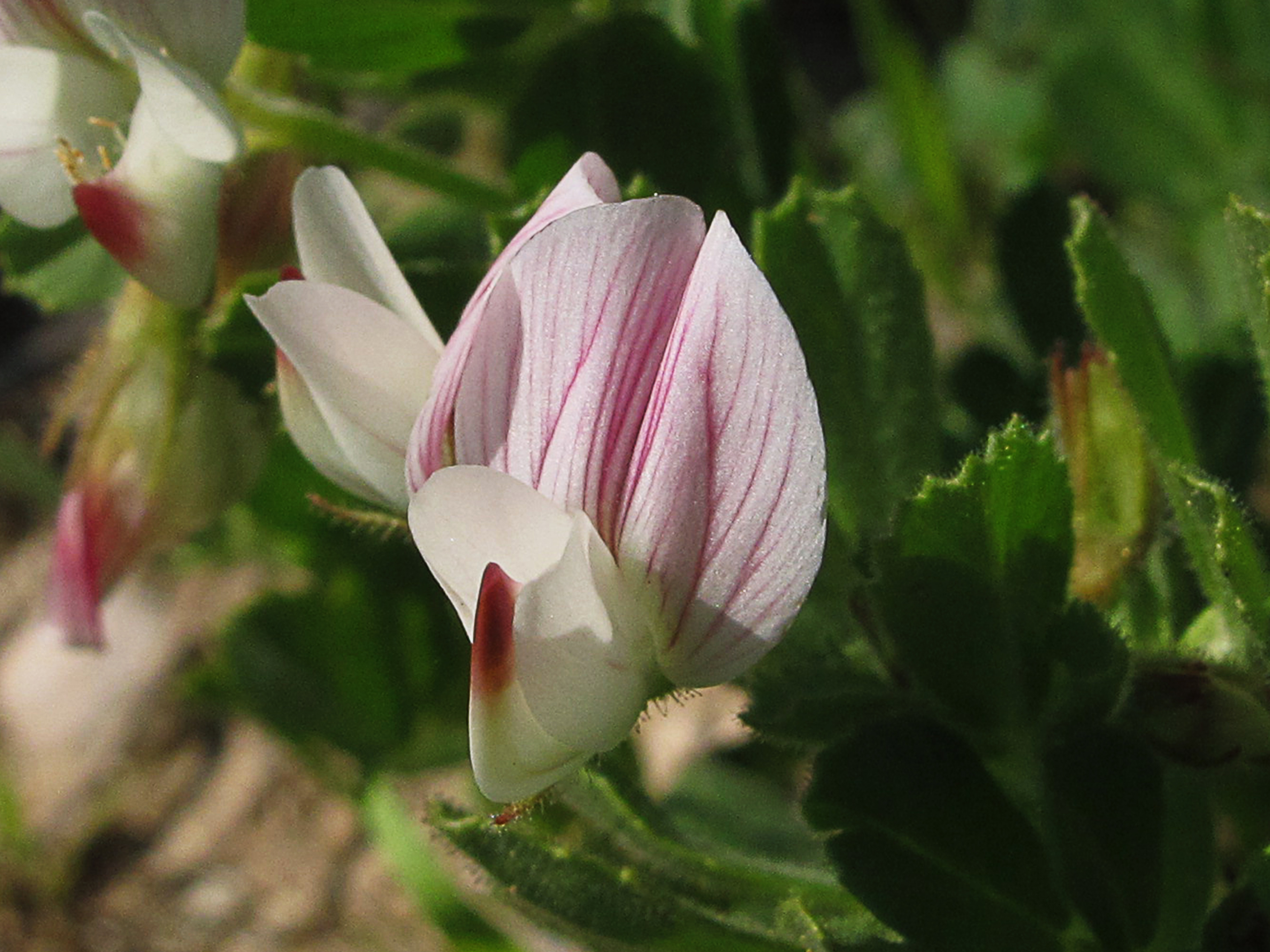

Scientific classification
- Kingdom: Plantae
- Clade: Tracheophytes
- Clade: Angiosperms
- Clade: Eudicots
- Clade: Rosids
- Order: Fabales
- Family: Fabaceae
- Subfamily: Faboideae
- Genus: Ononis
- Species: O. biflora

Binomial name
- Ononis biflora Desf.

Synonyms
- Ononis geminiflora

= Ononis biflora =

Species of plant

Ononis biflora is a species of plants in the family Fabaceae.

== Sources ==
This article incorporates text from a free content work. Licensed under CC0 (license statement/permission). Text taken from Ononis biflora. Encyclopedia of Life.
