= Eurrhypis cacuminalis =

Scientific classification
- Domain: Eukaryota
- Kingdom: Animalia
- Phylum: Arthropoda
- Class: Insecta
- Order: Lepidoptera
- Family: Crambidae
- Genus: Eurrhypis
- Species: E. cacuminalis

Binomial name
- Eurrhypis cacuminalis (Eversmann, 1843)

Synonyms
- Ennychia cacuminalis Eversmann, 1843; Hercyna cacuminalis multiguttalis Staudinger, 1871

Species of moth

Eurrhypis cacuminalis is a species of moth in the family Crambidae. It is found in Greece, Bulgaria, Moldova, Ukraine, Russia and Turkey.

== Subspecies ==
- Eurrhypis cacuminalis cacuminalis
- Eurrhypis cacuminalis multiguttalis Staudinger, 1871 (Greece)
