= Bembecia fokidensis =

Scientific classification
- Kingdom: Animalia
- Phylum: Arthropoda
- Class: Insecta
- Order: Lepidoptera
- Family: Sesiidae
- Genus: Bembecia
- Species: B. fokidensis

Binomial name
- Bembecia fokidensis Tosevski, 1991

Species of moth

Bembecia fokidensis is a moth of the family Sesiidae. It is found in Greece.

The wingspan is about 20 mm.

The larvae bore the roots of Trifolium species, including Trifolium fragiferum.
