= Bembecia himmighoffeni =

Scientific classification
- Kingdom: Animalia
- Phylum: Arthropoda
- Clade: Pancrustacea
- Class: Insecta
- Order: Lepidoptera
- Family: Sesiidae
- Genus: Bembecia
- Species: B. himmighoffeni

Binomial name
- Bembecia himmighoffeni (Staudinger, 1866)

Synonyms
- Sesia himmighoffeni Staudinger, 1866; Bembecia baumgartneri Spatenka, 1992

Species of moth

Bembecia himmighoffeni is a moth of the family Sesiidae. It is found from the Iberian Peninsula, through Italy to the Dalmatian coast.

The wingspan is 18–22 millimetres (0.71–0.87 in). Adults are on wing from late July to August.

The larvae feed on Coronilla species, including Coronilla minima. There are also records for larvae feeding on Rumex species.
