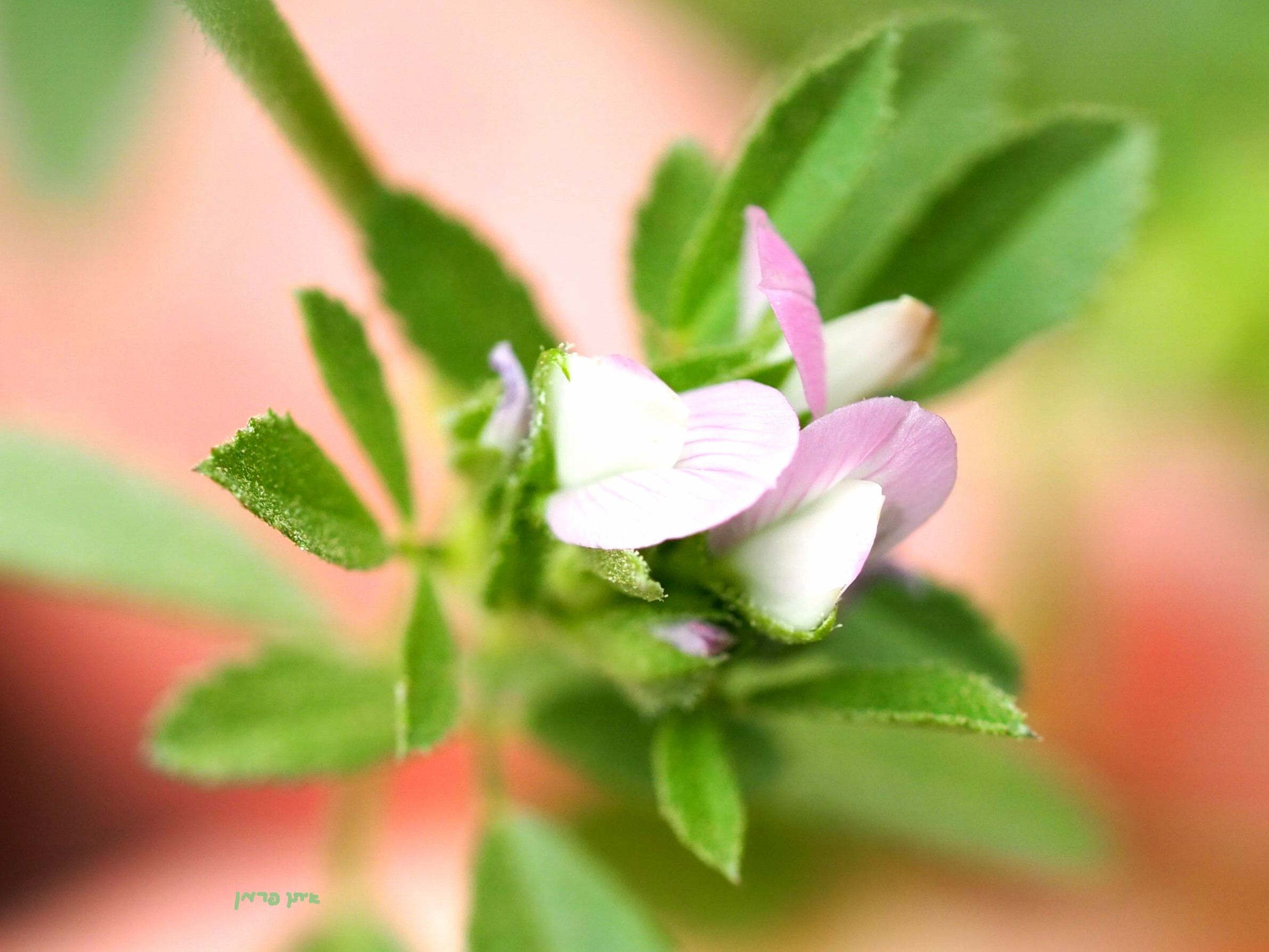

Scientific classification
- Kingdom: Plantae
- Clade: Tracheophytes
- Clade: Angiosperms
- Clade: Eudicots
- Clade: Rosids
- Order: Fabales
- Family: Fabaceae
- Subfamily: Faboideae
- Genus: Ononis
- Species: O. mitissima

Binomial name
- Ononis mitissima L.

= Ononis mitissima =

Species of plant

Ononis mitissima is a species of annual herb in the family Fabaceae. They have a self-supporting growth form and broad leaves. Individuals can grow to 5 cm tall.

== Sources ==
This article incorporates text from a free content work. Licensed under CC0 (license statement/permission). Text taken from Ononis mitissima. Encyclopedia of Life.
