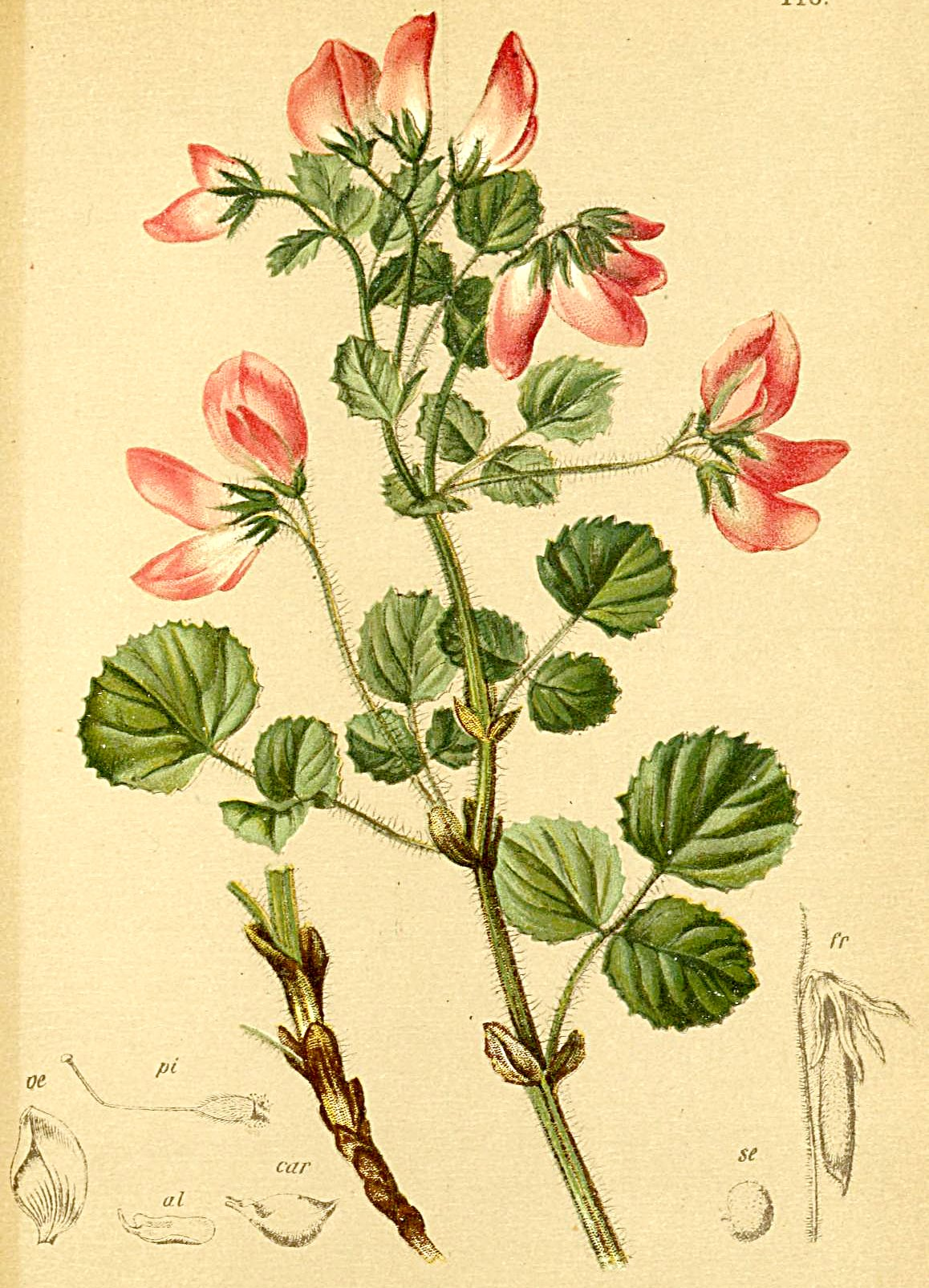

Scientific classification
- Kingdom: Plantae
- Clade: Tracheophytes
- Clade: Angiosperms
- Clade: Eudicots
- Clade: Rosids
- Order: Fabales
- Family: Fabaceae
- Subfamily: Faboideae
- Genus: Ononis
- Species: O. rotundifolia

Binomial name
- Ononis rotundifolia L.

Synonyms
- Ononis tribracteata DC.; Natrix rotundifolia (L.) Moench; Ononis glandulifera Weinm.; Ononis latifolia Asso

= Ononis rotundifolia =

Species of legume

Ononis rotundifolia, commonly known as round-leaved restharrow, is a perennial shrub belonging to the genus Ononis of the family Fabaceae.

== Description ==
Ononis rotundifolia reaches on average 20–60 centimetres (7.9–23.6 in) of height, with a maximum of 150 centimetres (59 in). The stem and the leaves are slightly hairy and sticky. The leaves are composed of three irregularly toothed and almost rounded leaflets (hence the specific Latin name rotundifolia), the median one with a long petiole. This plant bears clusters of two or three pink flowers streaked with red, about 15–18 millimetres (0.59–0.71 in) wide. The flowering period extends from June through September. Ononis rotundifolia is also used as an ornamental plant.

== Gallery ==
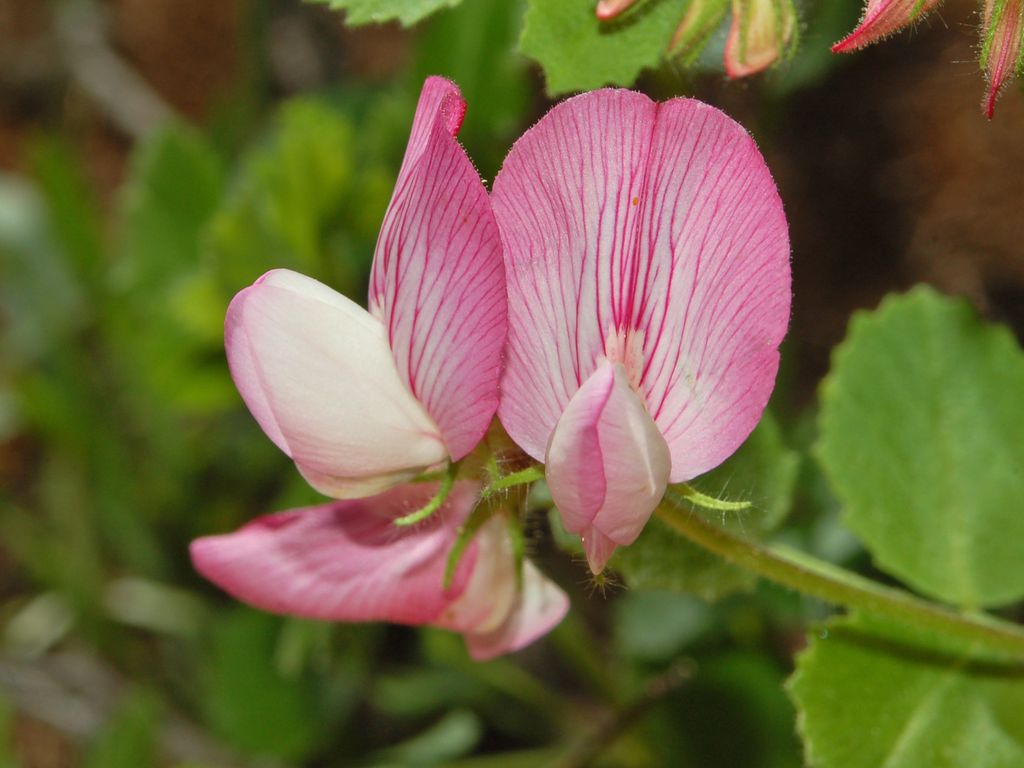
Flowers of Ononis rotundifolia

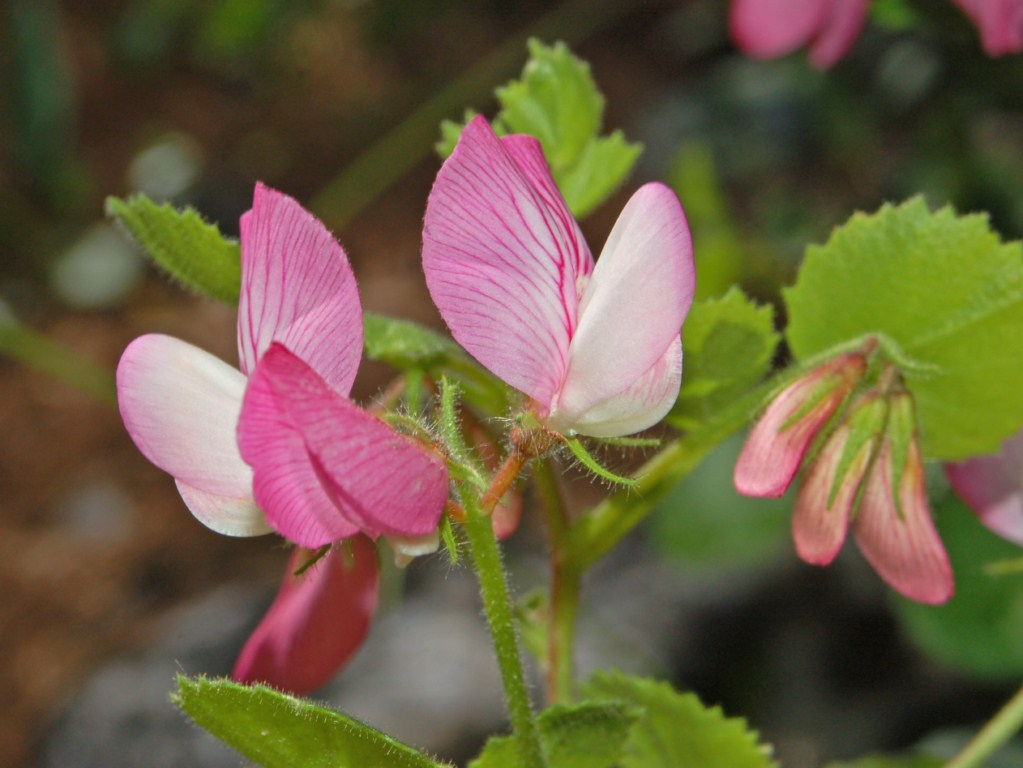
Flowers of Ononis rotundifolia

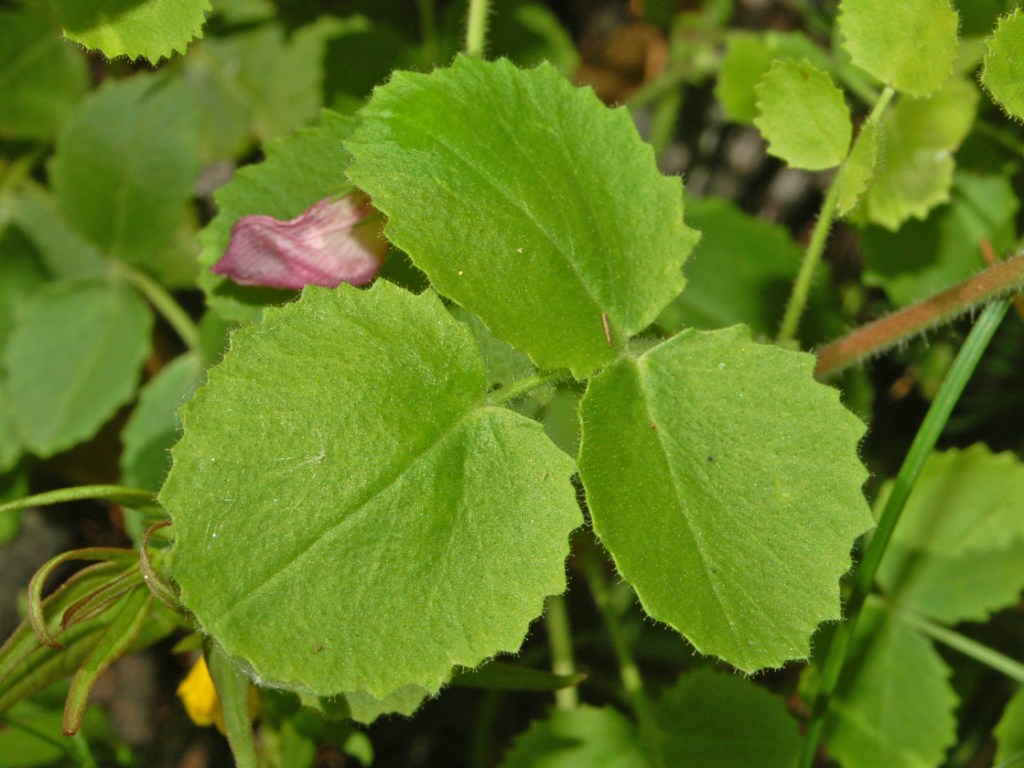
Leaf of Ononis rotundifolia

== Distribution ==
This quite rare north-western Mediterranean shrub occurs in Austria, Switzerland, Italy, France and Spain, mainly in the Alps, the Cevennes and the Pyrenees.

== Habitat ==
These plants prefer calcareous soils in dry grasslands, rocky meadows, slopes or hillsides. They can be found at an altitude of 800–1,800 metres (2,600–5,900 ft).

== Subspecies ==
- Ononis rotundifolia var. aristata DC.
- Ononis rotundifolia var. orbiculata Rouy in Rouy & Foucaud
