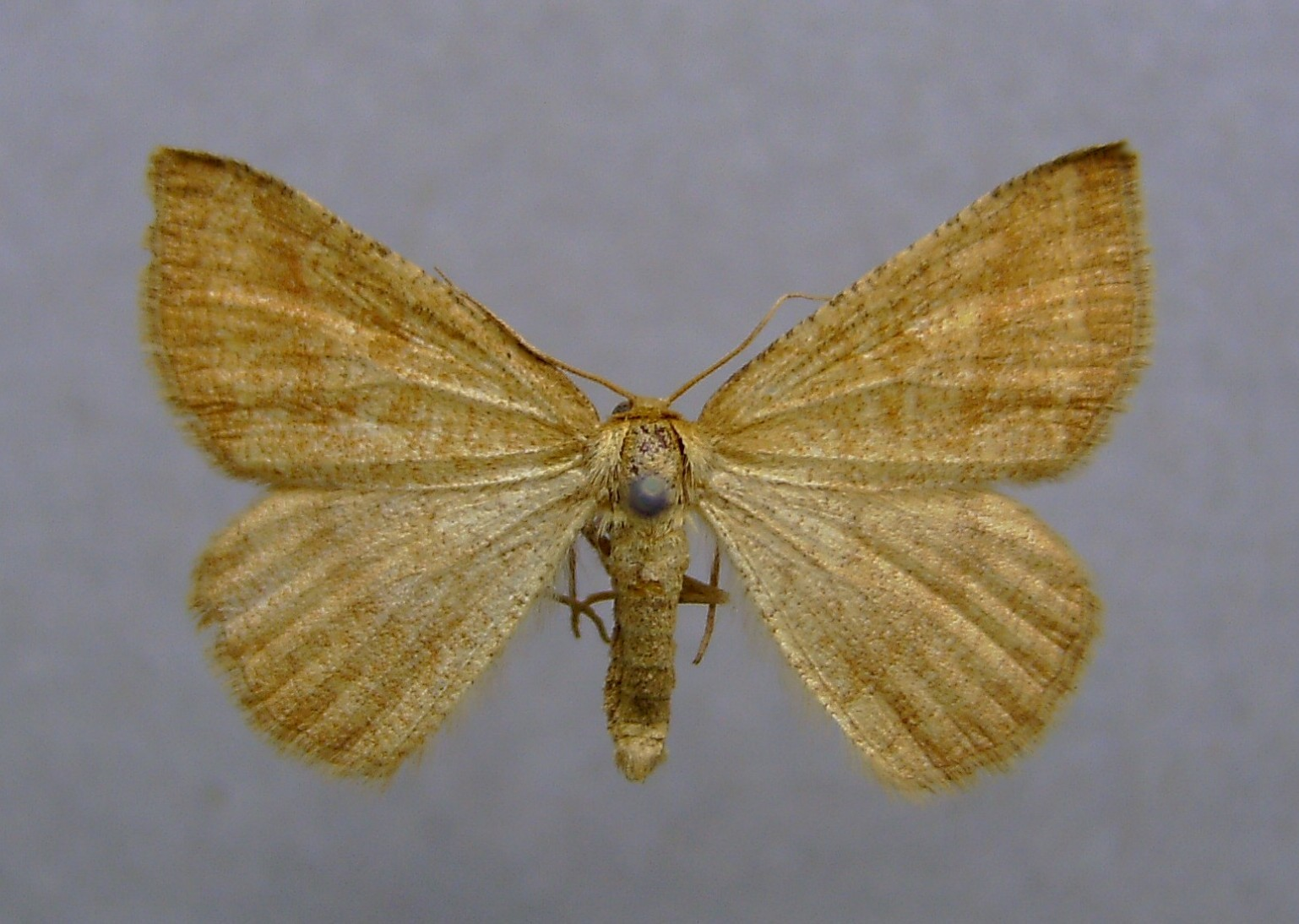

Scientific classification
- Kingdom: Animalia
- Phylum: Arthropoda
- Clade: Pancrustacea
- Class: Insecta
- Order: Lepidoptera
- Family: Geometridae
- Genus: Aplasta; Hübner, [1823]
- Species: A. ononaria

Binomial name
- Aplasta ononaria (Füssli, 1783)

Synonyms
- Phalaena Geometra ononaria Fuessly, 1783; Phalaena Geometra rubellata Villers, 1789; Geometra sudataria Hübner, [1817]; Geometra faecaturia Hübner, [1819]; Aplasta ononata Bellier, 1861; Aplasta ononaria spinosaria Dannehl, 1926

= Aplasta =

Monotypic genus of geometer moths

Aplasta is a monotypic genus of moth in the family Geometridae erected by Jacob Hübner in 1823. Its only species, Aplasta ononaria, the rest harrow, was first described by Johann Kaspar Füssli in 1783. It is found in southern Europe to Anatolia and from England to the Baltic states.

The wingspan is 26–31 mm. The length of the forewings 13–14 mm. The moth flies from June to September depending on the location.

The larvae feed on Ononis.
