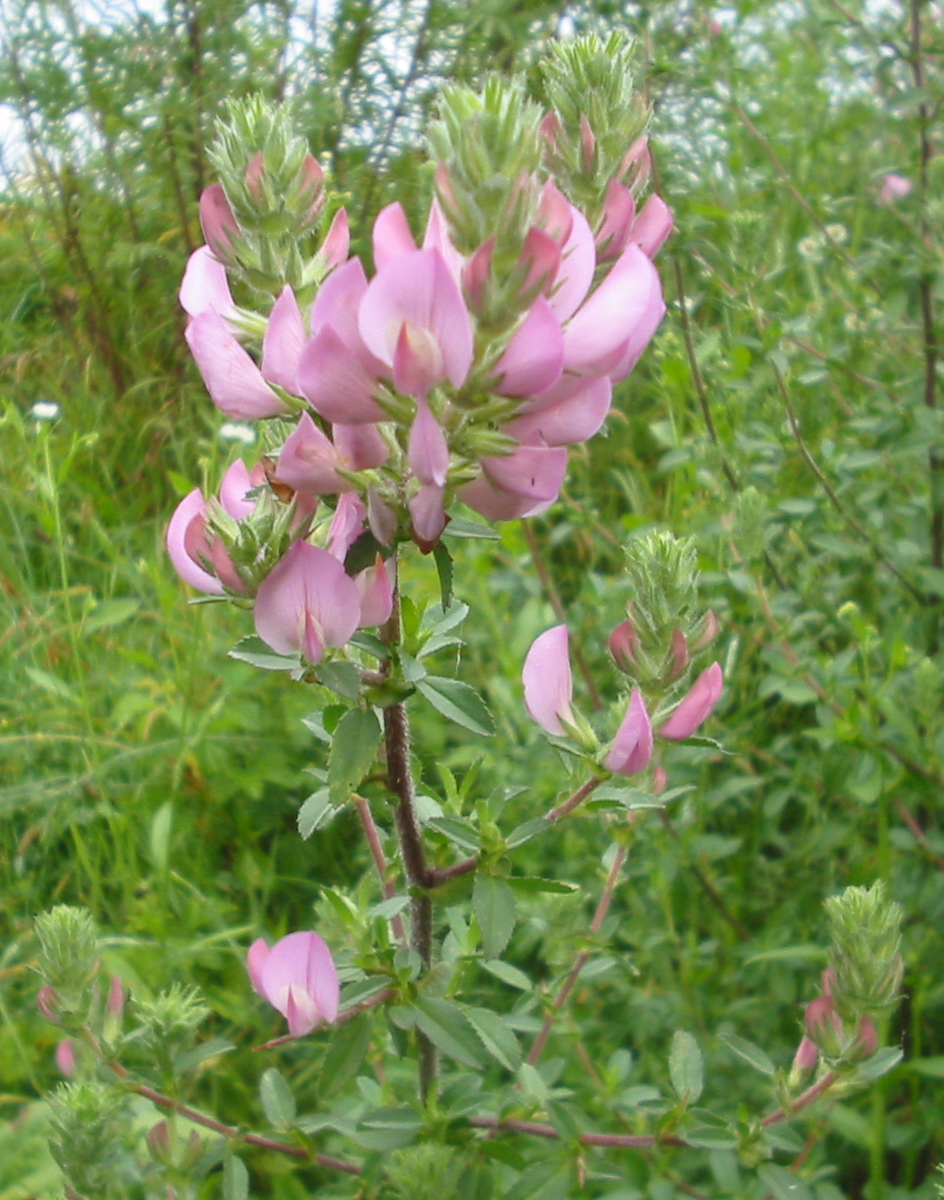
- Inflorescence

Scientific classification
- Kingdom: Plantae
- Clade: Embryophytes
- Clade: Tracheophytes
- Clade: Spermatophytes
- Clade: Angiosperms
- Clade: Eudicots
- Clade: Rosids
- Order: Fabales
- Family: Fabaceae
- Subfamily: Faboideae
- Genus: Ononis
- Species: O. arvensis

Binomial name
- Ononis arvensis L.

Synonyms
- List: Anonis arvensis (L.) Lam.; Bonaga arvensis (L.) Medik.; Bonaga hircina (Jacq.) Medik.; Bonaga mitis (Mill.) Medik.; Ononis alopecuroides Coss.; Ononis altissima Colmeiro; Ononis altissima Lam.; Ononis arvensis var. spinescens (Ledeb.) Diklić; Ononis arvensis subsp. spinescens (Ledeb.) Luzhanin; Ononis arvensis f. subrepens (Schmalh.) Luzhanin; Ononis hircina Jacq.; Ononis hircina var. spinescens Ledeb.; Ononis hircina var. subrepens Schmalh.; Ononis inermis Huds.; Ononis inermis Pall.; Ononis laevis Pall.; Ononis mitis Mill.; Ononis mitis Pall.; Ononis occidentalis Lange; Ononis procurrens Benth.; Ononis purpurea Gilib.; Ononis repens subsp. arvensis (L.) Greuter; Ononis repens subsp. spinosiformis (Simonk.) Greuter; Ononis spinescens (Ledeb.) Grecescu; Ononis spinosa subsp. arvensis (L.) Greuter & Burdet; Ononis spinosa subsp. hircina (Jacq.) Gams; Ononis spinosa subsp. spinosiformis (Simonk.) Greuter & Burdet; Ononis spinosiformis var. nyirsegensis (Soó) Soó; Ononis spinosiformis subsp. semihircina (Simonk.) Soó; Ononis spinosiformis Simonk.; Ononis vulgaris Gueldenst.

= Ononis arvensis =

Species of plant

Ononis arvensis, the field restharrow, is a widespread species of flowering plant in the family Fabaceae, native to Eurasia from central Europe through to western Siberia and the western Himalayas. It is a perennial hemicryptophyte usually 50–100 cm (20–39 in) tall, typically found in meadows, but also in old fields and dry grasslands.

It is closely related to Ononis spinosa and Ononis repens, being treated (together with O. repens) by some authors as a subspecies of O. spinosa. It shares pink flower colour with these two; from O. spinosa it differs in having its flowers in pairs at each node rather than singly, and (like O. repens) in lacking stiff spines; the wing petal size is small as in O. spinosa, rather than equalling the keel petal as in O. repens. It has a more easterly distribution than either O. spinosa or O. repens, not being found west of southern Scandinavia and Germany, and extending further into central Asia.
