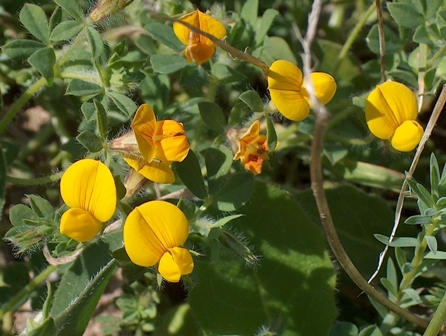

Scientific classification
- Kingdom: Plantae
- Clade: Tracheophytes
- Clade: Angiosperms
- Clade: Eudicots
- Clade: Rosids
- Order: Fabales
- Family: Fabaceae
- Subfamily: Faboideae
- Genus: Ononis
- Species: O. natrix

Binomial name
- Ononis natrix L.

= Ononis natrix =

Species of legume

Ononis natrix, the yellow restharrow or shrubby rest-harrow, is a species of plant in the family Fabaceae.

== Description ==
Perennial, 50–100 cm, ligneous at base, completely viscous-glandular. Leaves with three oblong and denticulate leaflets. Flowers in terminal leafy racemes. Peduncles long, one-flowered, often aristate. Calyx lobes much longer than tube. Corolla 15 mm, twice as long as calyx, yellow. Standard with red brown striations.

== Flowering ==
April–July.

== Habitat ==
Sandy and stony places on limestone.

== Distribution ==
Coast, lower and middle mountains, Beqaa, South, Antilebanon.

== Geographic area ==
Syria, Lebanon, Palestine, Jordan, Egypt, Libya, Tunisia, Algeria, Morocco, Circum-Mediterranean.

Onônis or anônis is the Greek name of a Mediterranean species of the genus. It is sometimes interpreted as formed of onos, donkey. and onesis. happiness. for certain rest-harrows were thought to please to donkeys. Nalrix is the name of a water snake, given to a plant whose pollen tube discharges ciliated antherozoids which swim ( just like a water snake) before entering the embryo sac.

The branches of this plant. known in Arabic by the name lissayq, are used in the preparation of raisin.
