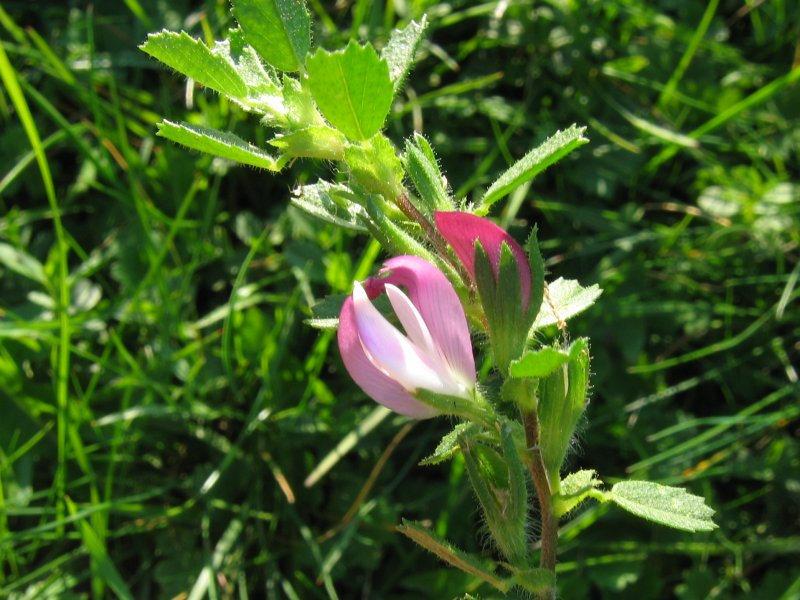

Scientific classification
- Kingdom: Plantae
- Clade: Tracheophytes
- Clade: Angiosperms
- Clade: Eudicots
- Clade: Rosids
- Order: Fabales
- Family: Fabaceae
- Subfamily: Faboideae
- Genus: Ononis
- Species: O. repens

Binomial name
- Ononis repens L.

= Ononis repens =

Species of legume

Ononis repens, the common restharrow, is a flowering plant species in the bean family Fabaceae. Its status is disputed; the Plants of the World Online database currently treats it as a subspecies of Ononis spinosa as Ononis spinosa subsp. procurrens, but other authorities, including the Botanical Society of Britain and Ireland, treat it as a separate species.

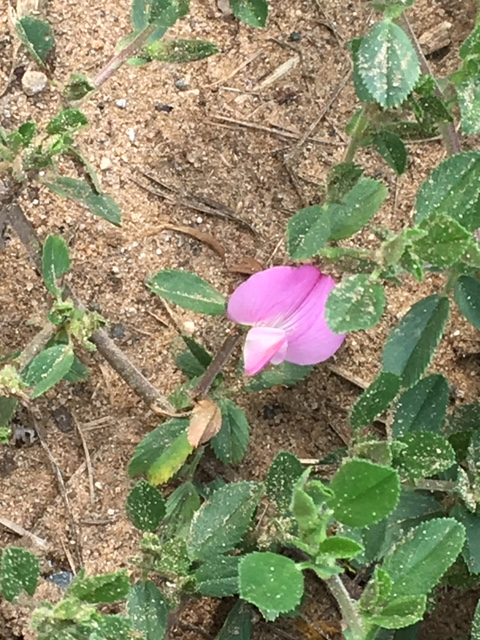
Ononis repens on a Lincolnshire roadside (United Kingdom) in 2019. There is some sand on the leaves.

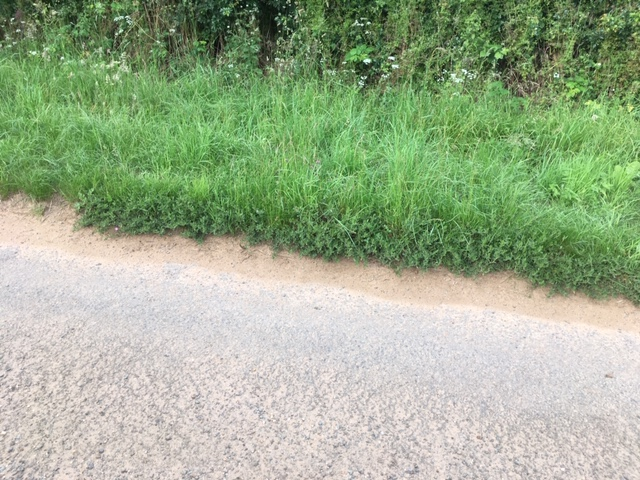
Plants viewed from further away

== Description ==
It is a prostrate (maximum height 60 cm) woody perennial, spreading by rhizomes. It has hairy stems and small oval leaves with toothed edges. Leaflets are less than 3 times as long as wide. It occasionally has soft, weak spines, but never hard spines like those of Ononis spinosa. The leaves are covered in glandular hairs which give a resinous smell on bruising. Plants are hermaphroditic. The zygomorphic flowers are pink and unscented, 15–20mm, blooming from June to September; the wing (side) petals are as long as the keel petal, unlike O. spinosa, where the wing petals are shorter than the keel petal.

== Habitat and distribution ==
It is found by the sea shore, on cliffs and dunes and is also common in grasslands and dry hill pastures in chalk or limestone areas, over light, well-drained soils. It may occasionally grow on roadside verges or beside railways.

The species is native to Europe including the UK and Ireland. Its distribution spreads as far south as Morocco and as far east as Poland. It has declined in some parts of Britain but populations are generally stable. Although the species is very widespread, its distribution is often localised, due to its preference for particular soil conditions

== Ecology ==
A rare species of moth, Aplasta ononaria is specialised to lay its eggs only on common restharrow.

Ononis repens is pollinated by bees.

Like other species in the order Fabales, Ononis repens fixes nitrogen into soil from the air, promoting the growth of other plants.

== Culinary use ==
Ononis repens is related to liquorice and its roots have a very similar flavour. A liquorice flavour drink can be made by soaking the roots in cold water, and historically the young shoots have been used as a vegetable, boiled or in salads.

== Etymology ==
The English common name 'restharrow' comes from the plant's propensity to stop horse-drawn farming implements, with its hard, woody roots. The word 'ononis' or 'anonis' has been used for restharrow since classical Greece and Rome and has been suggested to stem from the Ancient Greek onos for donkey because it was used to feed donkeys. The species epithet repens is Latin for creeping, referring to the growth habit of the plant.
