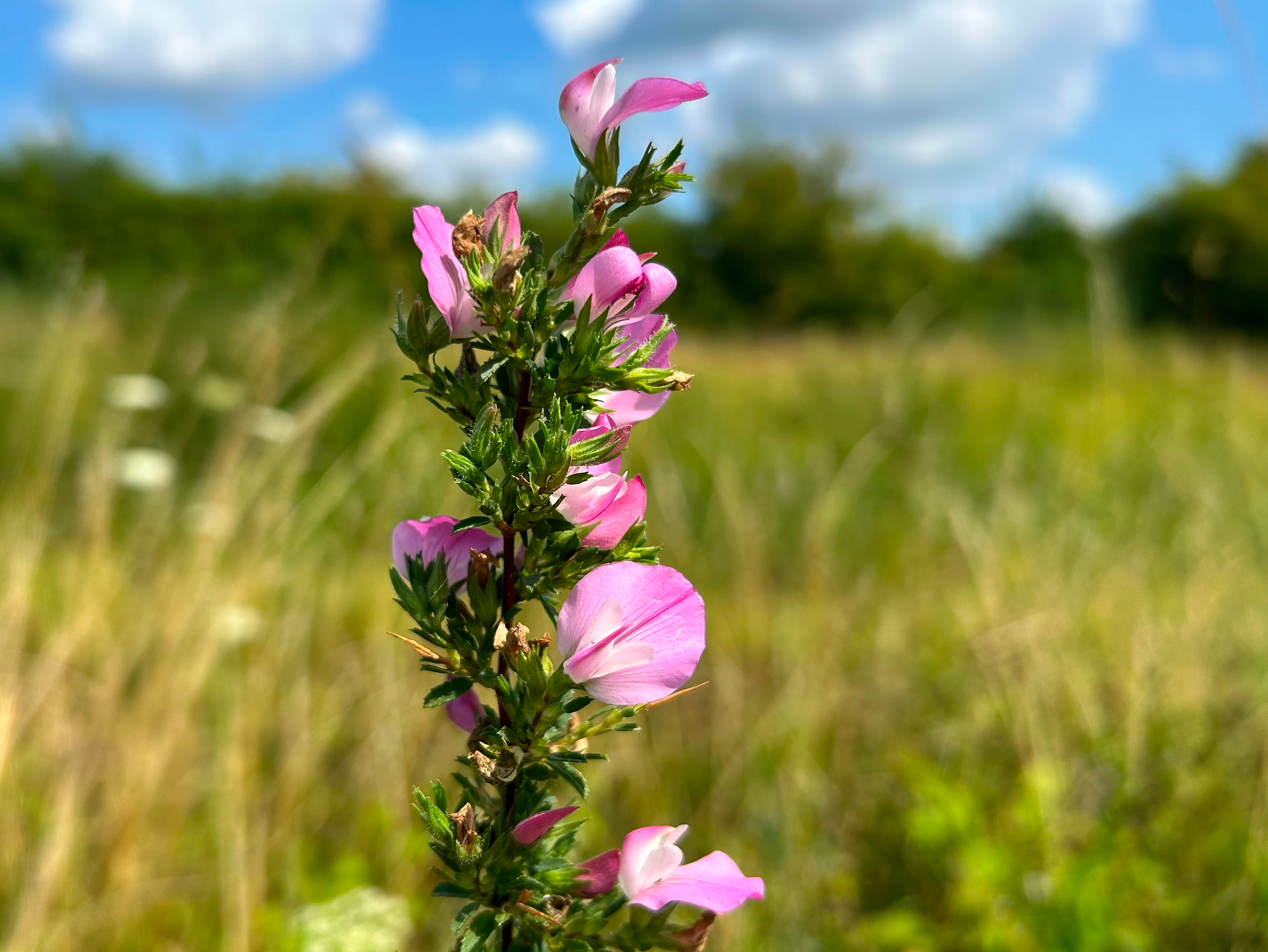
- Ononis spinosa

Scientific classification
- Kingdom: Plantae
- Clade: Tracheophytes
- Clade: Angiosperms
- Clade: Eudicots
- Clade: Rosids
- Order: Fabales
- Family: Fabaceae
- Subfamily: Faboideae
- Tribe: Trifolieae
- Genus: Ononis; L. 1753

Species
- See text

Synonyms
- Anonis (Tourn. ex) Adans 1763; Bonaga Medik. 1787; Bugranopsis Pomel 1874; Natrix Moench 1794; Passaea Adans. 1763

= Ononis =

Genus of legumes

Ononis is a genus of 80–90 species of perennial herbs and subshrubs in the legume family Fabaceae. The members of this genus are called restharrows; an old spelling "wrestharrows" is also recorded from 1965. as some species grow as weeds on arable lands where their tough roots would catch and stop the harrow. The genus is native to Europe, northern and eastern Africa, and western and central Asia.

In herbalism restharrow is used to treat bladder and kidney problems and water retention.

The active ingredients in restharrow are essential oils, flavonoid-glycosides, and tannins.

Restharrows are used as food plants by the larvae of some Lepidoptera species including the grey pug and Coleophora ononidella (which feeds exclusively on O. arvensis).

== Species of Ononis ==
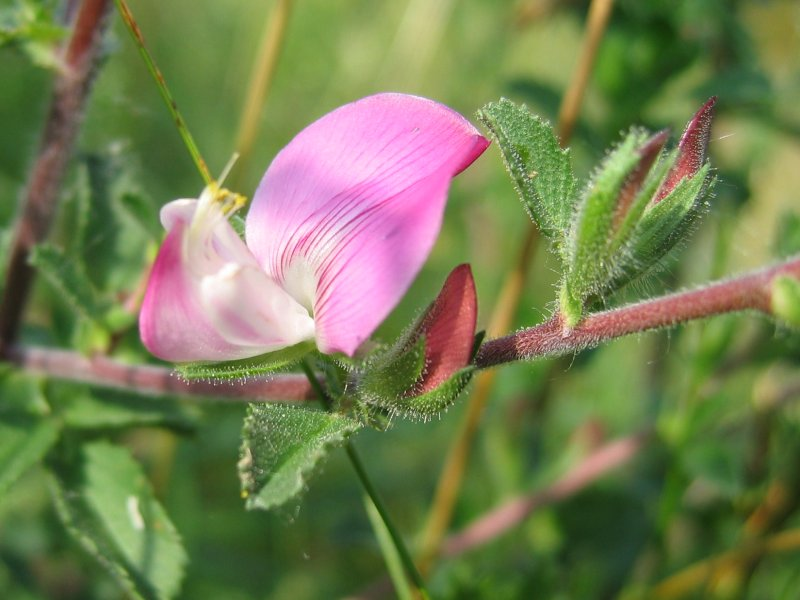
O. arvensis

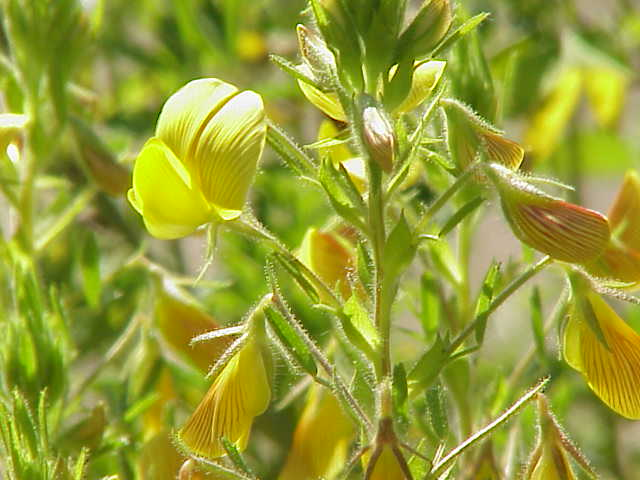
Ononis natrix, flowers and foliage

The genus Ononis includes the following species accepted by the Plants of the World Online database (POWO), with the addition of one species (O. repens) accepted by the Botanical Society of Britain and Ireland and others (see further below):

- Ononis adenotricha Boiss.
- Ononis afghanica Širj. & Rech.f.
- Ononis alba Poir.
- Ononis alopecuroides L. — foxtail restharrow
- Ononis angustissima Lam.
- Ononis antennata Pomel
- Ononis aragonensis Asso
- Ononis arvensis L. — field restharrow
- Ononis atlantica Ball
- Ononis aurasiaca Förther & Podlech
- Ononis avellana Pomel
- Ononis azcaratei Devesa
- Ononis baetica Clemente
- Ononis basiadnata Hub.-Mor.
- Ononis biflora Desf.
- Ononis broteroana Ser.
- Ononis catalinae Reyes-Bet. & S.Scholz
- Ononis cephalantha Pomel
- Ononis cephalotes Boiss.
- Ononis christii Bolle
- Ononis cintrana Brot.
- Ononis clausonis (Pomel) Pomel
- Ononis cossoniana Boiss. & Reut.
- Ononis cossoniana Boiss. & Reut.
- Ononis costae Menezes
- Ononis crinita Pomel
- Ononis crispa L.
- Ononis cristata Mill.
- Ononis cuatrecasasii Devesa
- Ononis dentata Sol. ex Lowe
- Ononis diffusa Ten.
- Ononis euphrasiifolia Desf.
- Ononis filicaulis Salzm. ex Boiss.
- Ononis fruticosa L.
- Ononis gines-lopezii Devesa
- Ononis hebecarpa Webb & Berthel.
- Ononis hirta Desf. ex Poir.
- Ononis hispida Desf.
- Ononis incisa Coss. & Durieu ex Batt.
- Ononis intermedia C.A.Mey. ex Rouy
- Ononis jahandiezii Maire & Weiller
- Ononis laxiflora Desf.
- Ononis leucotricha Coss.
- Ononis macrosperma Hub.-Mor.
- Ononis maweana Ball
- Ononis megalostachys Munby
- Ononis minutissima L.
- Ononis mitissima L.
- Ononis mogadorensis Förther & Podlech
- Ononis natrix L. — large yellow restharrow
- Ononis nuristanica Podlech
- Ononis oligophylla Ten.
- Ononis ornithopodioides L.
- Ononis pedicellaris (Batt.) Širj.
- Ononis pendula Desf.
- Ononis peyerimhoffii Batt.
- Ononis phyllocephala Boiss.
- Ononis pinnata Brot.
- Ononis polyphylla Ball
- Ononis polysperma Barratte & Murb.
- Ononis pseudoserotina Batt. & Pit.
- Ononis pubescens L.
- Ononis pusilla L.
- Ononis ramosissima Desf.
- Ononis reclinata L. — small restharrow
- Ononis repens L. — common restharrow
- Ononis reuteri Boiss.
- Ononis rosea Durieu
- Ononis rotundifolia L.
- Ononis serotina Pomel
- Ononis serrata Forssk.
- Ononis sessilifolia Bornm.
- Ononis sicula Guss.
- Ononis sieberi Besser ex DC.
- Ononis speciosa Lag.
- Ononis spinosa L. — spiny restharrow
- Ononis striata Gouan
- Ononis talaverae Devesa & G.López
- Ononis tazaensis Förther & Podlech
- Ononis thomsonii Ball ex Oliv.
- Ononis tournefortii Coss.
- Ononis tridentata L.
- Ononis unifoliolata Dobignard, Jacquemoud & Jeanm.
- Ononis varelae Devesa
- Ononis variegata L.
- Ononis verae Širj.
- Ononis villosissima Desf.
- Ononis viscosa L.
- Ononis zygantha Maire & Wilczek

The status of Ononis repens is disputed; POWO treats it as a subspecies of O. spinosa (as O. spinosa subsp. procurrens (Wallr.) Briq.), while accepting O. arvensis as a separate species. However, in genetic analysis (in which both O. repens and O. arvensis were treated as subspecies of O. spinosa, as O. s. subsp. maritima and O. s. subsp. arvensis, respectively), O. repens recovered as more closely related to O. arvensis, than to O. spinosa. It remains widely accepted as a species, particularly in Great Britain and Ireland, where it is the most widespread and abundant species in the genus.

=== Nothospecies ===
- Ononis × schouwii Ser.
