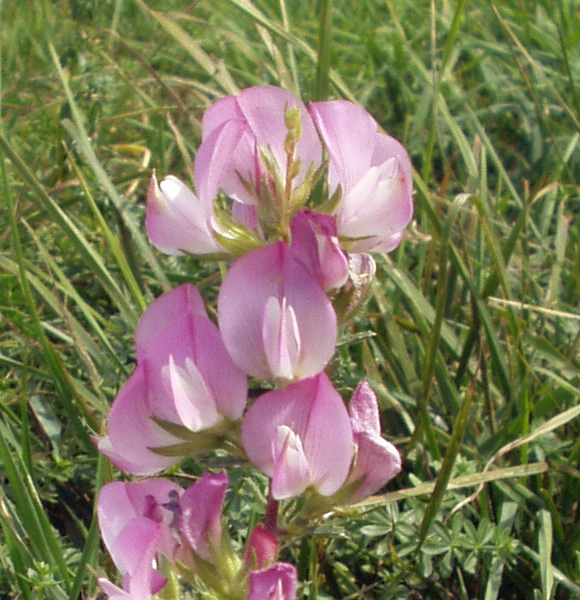

Scientific classification
- Kingdom: Plantae
- Clade: Tracheophytes
- Clade: Angiosperms
- Clade: Eudicots
- Clade: Rosids
- Order: Fabales
- Family: Fabaceae
- Subfamily: Faboideae
- Genus: Ononis
- Species: O. spinosa

Binomial name
- Ononis spinosa L.

Synonyms
- Ononis vulgaris Rouy pro parte

= Ononis spinosa =

Species of legume

Ononis spinosa is a flowering plant belonging to the family Fabaceae, that is commonly known as spiny restharrow or just restharrow. It is found throughout much of Europe including Britain, but rarely as far north as Scotland. It is closely related to Ononis repens (common restharrow); the two are considered conspecific by the Plants of the World Online database, with O. repens treated as a subspecies of O. spinosa as Ononis spinosa subsp. procurrens. The Botanical Society of Britain and Ireland treats them as separate species.

== Description ==
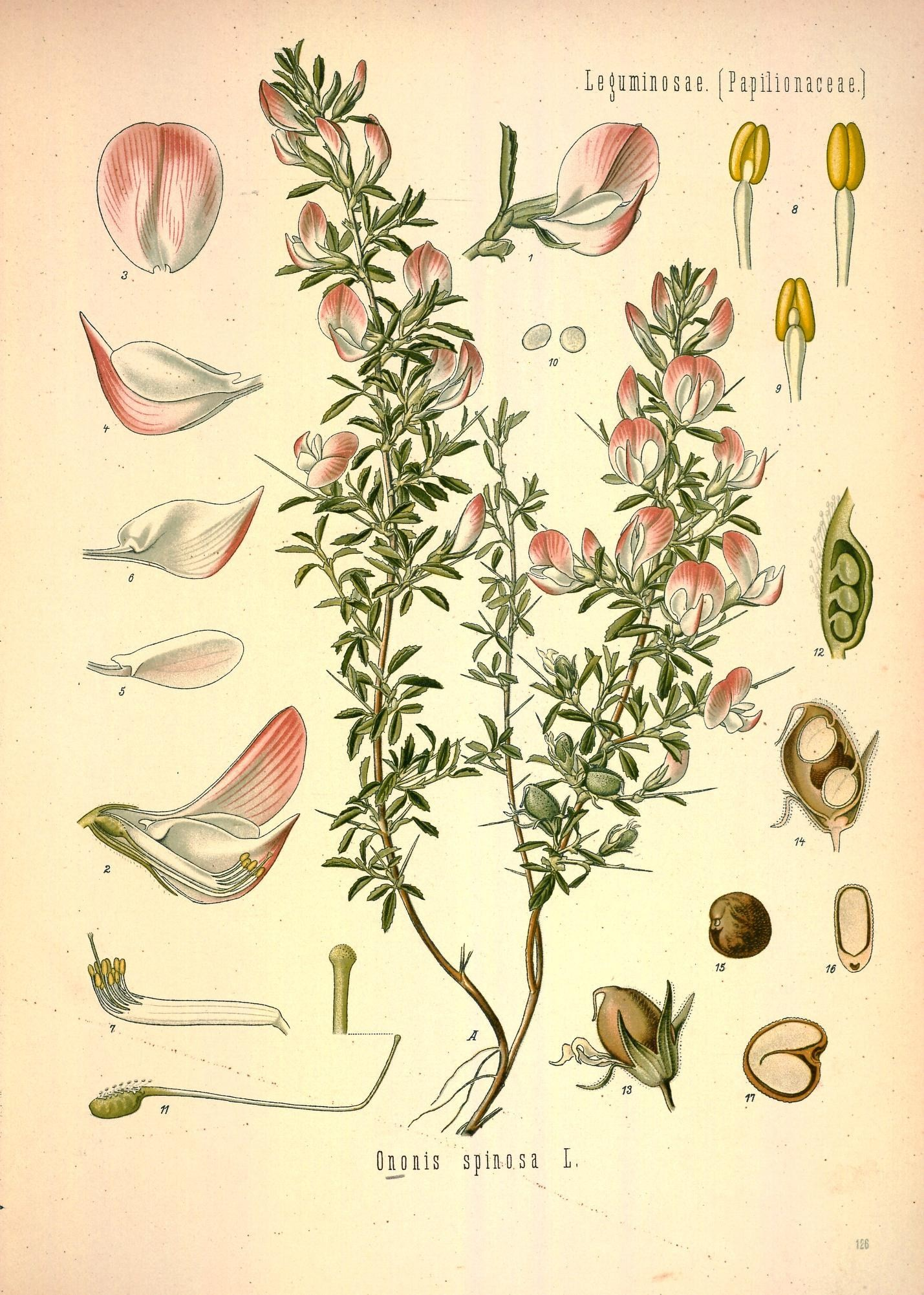
Illustration showing plant details.

Spiny restharrow is an upright, bushy perennial. The wiry, branched stem is downy and nearly always spiny and grows to a height of 60 cm (24 in). The leaves are small, dark green, oval or trifoliate, with toothed leaf-like stipules at their base. The flowers are deep pink and white, with the wing (side) petals shorter than the hooked keel petal (unlike O. repens, where the wings are as long as the keel), and the calyx usually shorter than the pod.

== Distribution and habitat ==
Spiny restharrow is found in southern temperate areas of Europe and Siberia. In Great Britain, it has a more southeasterly distribution than O. repens, occurring widely in central and southeastern England, scarce in Wales and southwestern and northern England, and only at a very few sites in the south of Scotland. It is not native in Ireland, only found there as a rare introduced plant. Its typical habitat is lime-rich, but nutrient-poor grassland on chalk and heavy, calcareous soils.

== Historical use ==
In medieval Russia, the plant was used for bulat steel. The details of the manufacturing process have been lost. It involved dipping the finished weapon into a vat containing a special liquid of which spiny restharrow extract was a part (the plant's name in Russian, stalnik, reflects its historical role), then holding the sword aloft while galloping on a horse, allowing it to dry and harden against the wind.

In traditional Russian herbal medicine, it was used as an anodyne, antiphlogistic, aperient, coagulant and diuretic. A decoction of restharrow was used for eczema and other skin problems, hemorrhoids, chronic constipation, and infections of the anus.
