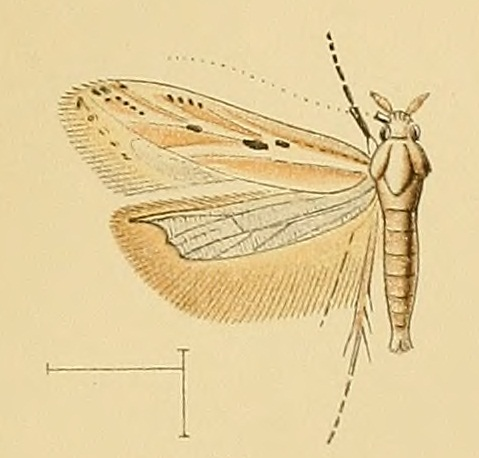
- Metzneria aestivella dichroa

Scientific classification
- Kingdom: Animalia
- Phylum: Arthropoda
- Clade: Pancrustacea
- Class: Insecta
- Order: Lepidoptera
- Family: Gelechiidae
- Genus: Metzneria
- Species: M. aestivella

Binomial name
- Metzneria aestivella (Zeller, 1839)

Synonyms
- Gelechia aestivella Zeller, 1839; Gelechia carlinella Stainton, 1851; Metzneria carlinella; Gelechia selaginella Mann, 1855; Parasia torridella Mann, 1859; Metzneria dichroa Walsingham, [1908]

= Metzneria aestivella =

Species of moth

Metzneria aestivella is a moth of the family Gelechiidae. It is found in most of Europe, except Iceland, Norway, Lithuania, Slovakia and Ukraine. The habitat consists of dry, sunny areas with low-growing herbaceous plants.

The wingspan is 11–15 mm. Adults are similar to Metzneria lappella and Metzneria metzneriella .

Adults are on wing from June to July.

Larvae can be found in winter and spring in old flowers of Carlina vulgaris, Pyrethrum corymbosum and Carlina acaulis. Full-grown larvae reach a length of 8–9 mm.

== Subspecies ==
- Metzneria aestivella aestivella
- Metzneria aestivella dichroa Walsingham, 1908 (Canary Islands)
