= Lutilabria lutilabrella =

Scientific classification
- Domain: Eukaryota
- Kingdom: Animalia
- Phylum: Arthropoda
- Class: Insecta
- Order: Lepidoptera
- Family: Gelechiidae
- Genus: Lutilabria
- Species: L. lutilabrella

Binomial name
- Lutilabria lutilabrella (J. J. Mann, 1857)

Synonyms
- Gelechia lutilabrella J. J. Mann, 1857; Lutilabria olympica Huemer, 1993

Species of moth

Lutilabria lutilabrella is a moth in the family Gelechiidae. It was described by Josef Johann Mann in 1857. It is found in Croatia, Slovenia, Bulgaria, Greece and Ukraine.

The forewings are greyish brown without markings. The hindwings are grey.

== Subspecies ==
- Lutilabria lutilabrella lutilabrella
- Lutilabria lutilabrella olympica Huemer, 1993 (Bulgaria)
