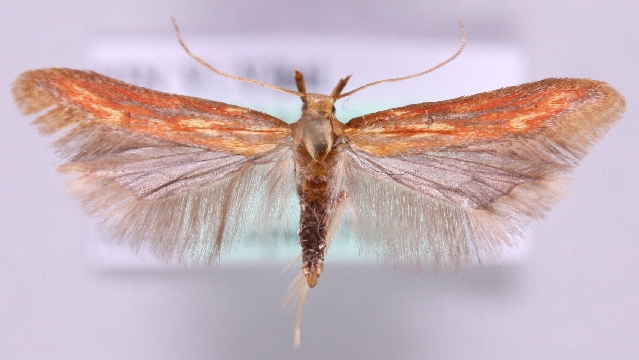

Scientific classification
- Kingdom: Animalia
- Phylum: Arthropoda
- Class: Insecta
- Order: Lepidoptera
- Family: Gelechiidae
- Genus: Metzneria
- Species: M. aprilella

Binomial name
- Metzneria aprilella (Herrich-Schäffer, 1854)

Synonyms
- Parasia aprilella Herrich-Schäffer, 1854; Metzneria igneella Tengström, 1859; Metzneria sanguinolentella de Joannis, 1910

= Metzneria aprilella =

Species of moth

Metzneria aprilella, the brilliant neb, is a moth of the family Gelechiidae. It is widely distributed throughout Europe. Outside of Europe, it is found in Turkey, Kazakhstan, Uzbekistan, Iran and southern Siberia. The habitat consists of waste ground and grassland.

The wingspan is 13–18 mm. Adults are on wing from May to August.

The larvae feed on Centaurea scabiosa and Centaurea solstitialis. They feed on the seeds from within the seedhead.
