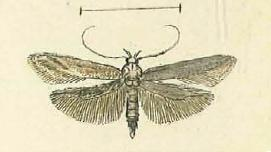

Scientific classification
- Domain: Eukaryota
- Kingdom: Animalia
- Phylum: Arthropoda
- Class: Insecta
- Order: Lepidoptera
- Family: Gelechiidae
- Genus: Metzneria
- Species: M. tenuiella

Binomial name
- Metzneria tenuiella (Mann, 1864)

Synonyms
- Gelechia tenuiella Mann, 1864; Apodia seminivora Walsingham, 1903; Ptocheuusa seminivora; Metzneria infelix Walsingham, 1908; Metzneria insignificans Walsingham, 1908

= Metzneria tenuiella =

Species of moth

Metzneria tenuiella is a moth of the family Gelechiidae. It is found in Spain, Portugal, France, Croatia, Turkey and on Crete and the Canary Islands.

The wingspan is about 14 mm. The forewings are pale brownish cinereous (ash-grey), thickly sprinkled with fuscous, the base more suffused than the outer half on which the sprinkling is more visible, spreading over the pale cinereous cilia, in which it tends to form three parallel sinuate dividing lines converging to the apex. Three small fuscous dots are faintly indicated, one on the cell very faint, one slightly stronger in the fold preceding it, and one at the end of the cell. The hindwings are grey.
