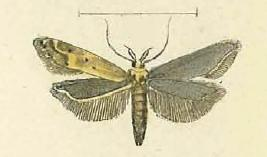

Scientific classification
- Kingdom: Animalia
- Phylum: Arthropoda
- Class: Insecta
- Order: Lepidoptera
- Family: Gelechiidae
- Genus: Metzneria
- Species: M. intestinella

Binomial name
- Metzneria intestinella (Mann, 1864)

Synonyms
- Parasia intestinella Mann, 1864

= Metzneria intestinella =

Species of moth

Metzneria intestinella is a moth of the family Gelechiidae. It is found in most of southern Europe.
