= Metzneria varennei =

Scientific classification
- Domain: Eukaryota
- Kingdom: Animalia
- Phylum: Arthropoda
- Class: Insecta
- Order: Lepidoptera
- Family: Gelechiidae
- Genus: Metzneria
- Species: M. varennei

Binomial name
- Metzneria varennei Nel, 1997

Species of moth

Metzneria varennei is a moth of the family Gelechiidae. It was described by Jacques Nel in 1997. It is found in France.

== Taxonomy ==
Metzneria varennei is closely related to and possibly conspecific with Metzneria campicolella.

== Etymology ==
The species is named in honour of Thierry Varenne.
