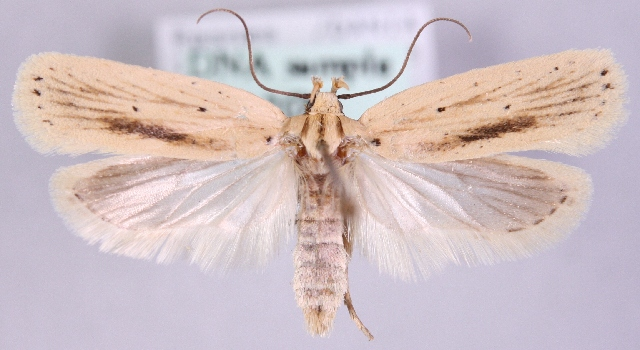

Scientific classification
- Kingdom: Animalia
- Phylum: Arthropoda
- Clade: Pancrustacea
- Class: Insecta
- Order: Lepidoptera
- Family: Depressariidae
- Genus: Agonopterix
- Species: A. pallorella

Binomial name
- Agonopterix pallorella (Zeller, 1839)

Synonyms
- Depressaria pallorella Zeller, 1839; Depressaria subpallorella Staudinger, 1870; Depressaria discognitella Herrich-Schäffer, 1871

= Agonopterix pallorella =

Species of moth

Agonopterix pallorella is a moth of the family Depressariidae. It is found in most of Europe.

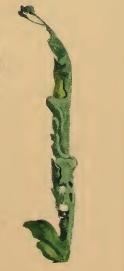
Leaf of Centaurea scabiosa folded by larva

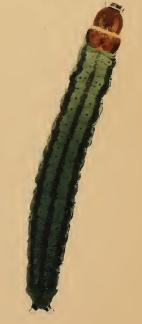
Larva

The wingspan is 19–24 mm. The forewings are whitish-ochreous, veins strewn with dots of dark fuscous scales; an indistinct dark fuscous longitudinal streak near dorsum from near base to before tornus; first and second discal stigmata black; terminal black dots. Hindwings ochreous-grey-whitish, greyer posteriorly. The larva is dull greenish, darker posteriorly; dorsal and subdorsal lines greenish-black; dots black; head red-brown; 2 pale reddish -brown, with two black crescentic marks

Adults are on wing from mid June to March.

The larvae feed on Centaurea species (including Centaurea scabiosa and Centaurea nigra) and Serratula tinctoria. They feed from within rolled leaves. The species overwinters as an adult. Pupation takes place below ground or in amongst plant detritus.
