= Metzneria riadella =

Scientific classification
- Kingdom: Animalia
- Phylum: Arthropoda
- Class: Insecta
- Order: Lepidoptera
- Family: Gelechiidae
- Genus: Metzneria
- Species: M. riadella

Binomial name
- Metzneria riadella Englert, 1974

Species of moth

Metzneria riadella is a moth of the family Gelechiidae. It was described by W. D. Englert in 1974. It is found in southern Europe (Spain, Crete, Cyprus) and in the Middle East (Cyprus, Turkey, Saudi Arabia, Iran). The type locality is Riad.

The larval host plant is unknown but could be some Plantago as for its closest relative, Metzneria littorella.
