= Metzneria expositoi =

Scientific classification
- Kingdom: Animalia
- Phylum: Arthropoda
- Clade: Pancrustacea
- Class: Insecta
- Order: Lepidoptera
- Family: Gelechiidae
- Genus: Metzneria
- Species: M. expositoi

Binomial name
- Metzneria expositoi Vives, 2001

Species of moth

Metzneria expositoi is a moth of the family Gelechiidae. It was described by Antonio Vives Moreno in 2001, from a population located in Cadiz, Spain. A 2020 catalogue of twister moths found that the DNA barcode and genitalia of the Spanish population matched exactly with that of Metzneria aestivella. Therefore, it is proposed that Metzneria expositoi exists as a junior synonym.

A recent comprehensive study of the butterfly fauna of Cyprus found that there might exist an island variant of Metzneria expositoi which has a DNA divergence of around 2%. This is enough to warrant a different Barcode Index Number (BIN). However, the researchers found that the variations were insufficient to reconsider the idea of a distinct species, given the extent of morphological similarities.
