= Merrifieldia semiodactylus =

Scientific classification
- Kingdom: Animalia
- Phylum: Arthropoda
- Class: Insecta
- Order: Lepidoptera
- Family: Pterophoridae
- Genus: Merrifieldia
- Species: M. semiodactylus

Binomial name
- Merrifieldia semiodactylus (Mann, 1855)

Synonyms
- Pterophorus semiodactylus Mann, 1855

Species of plume moth

Merrifieldia semiodactylus is a moth of the family Pterophoridae found on Corsica and Sardinia.

The larvae feed on apple mint (Mentha suaveolens insularis).
