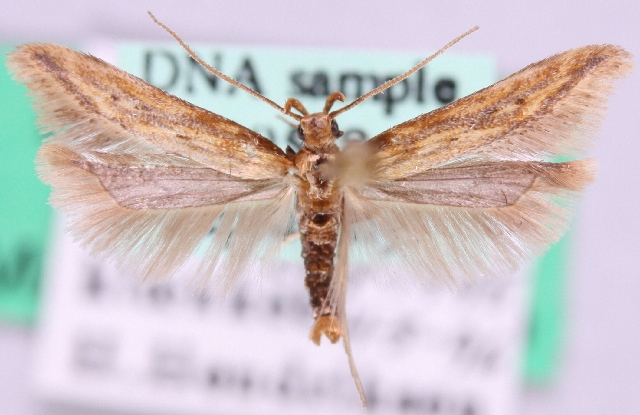

Scientific classification
- Kingdom: Animalia
- Phylum: Arthropoda
- Clade: Pancrustacea
- Class: Insecta
- Order: Lepidoptera
- Family: Gelechiidae
- Genus: Metzneria
- Species: M. ehikeella

Binomial name
- Metzneria ehikeella Gozmány, 1954

= Metzneria ehikeella =

Species of moth

Metzneria ehikeella is a moth of the family Gelechiidae. It is widely distributed from central and northern Europe to the Ural Mountains. It is also present in North Africa, Turkey, the Caucasus, the Near East and Central Asia.

The wingspan is 15–18 mm. Adults are on wing in June and July.

The larvae feed on Centaurea scabiosa.
