= Asalebria florella =

Scientific classification
- Domain: Eukaryota
- Kingdom: Animalia
- Phylum: Arthropoda
- Class: Insecta
- Order: Lepidoptera
- Family: Pyralidae
- Genus: Asalebria
- Species: A. florella

Binomial name
- Asalebria florella (J. J. Mann, 1862)

Synonyms
- Nephopteryx florella J. J. Mann, 1862; Pristophora florella; Myelois chiclanensis Staudinger, 1870; Pristophora joesti Amsel, 1953

Species of moth

Asalebria florella is a species of snout moth in the genus Asalebria. It was described by Josef Johann Mann in 1862. It is found in Spain, Portugal, France, Italy, Germany, Croatia, North Macedonia, Greece, Bulgaria, Romania, Ukraine, Russia and Turkey.
