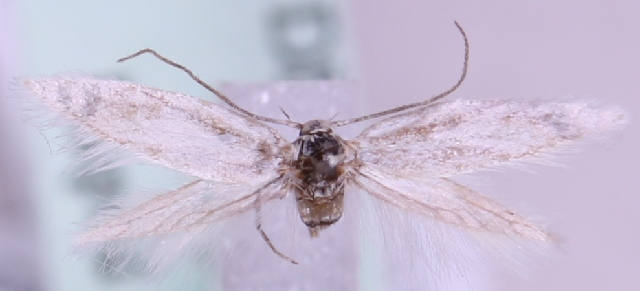

Scientific classification
- Kingdom: Animalia
- Phylum: Arthropoda
- Class: Insecta
- Order: Lepidoptera
- Family: Elachistidae
- Genus: Elachista
- Species: E. chionella

Binomial name
- Elachista chionella Mann, 1861

= Elachista chionella =

Species of moth

Elachista chionella is a moth of the family Elachistidae that is endemic to Turkey.

Adults have silky white forewings.
