= Asalebria pseudoflorella =

Scientific classification
- Domain: Eukaryota
- Kingdom: Animalia
- Phylum: Arthropoda
- Class: Insecta
- Order: Lepidoptera
- Family: Pyralidae
- Genus: Asalebria
- Species: A. pseudoflorella

Binomial name
- Asalebria pseudoflorella (Schmidt, 1934)

Synonyms
- Nephopteryx pseudoflorella Schmidt, 1934; Praesalebria pseudoflorella

Species of moth

Asalebria pseudoflorella is a species of snout moth in the genus Asalebria. It was described by Schmidt, in 1934. It is found in Spain.
