= Merrifieldia huberti =

Scientific classification
- Kingdom: Animalia
- Phylum: Arthropoda
- Class: Insecta
- Order: Lepidoptera
- Family: Pterophoridae
- Genus: Merrifieldia
- Species: M. huberti

Binomial name
- Merrifieldia huberti Arenberger, 1999

Species of plume moth

Merrifieldia huberti is a moth of the family Pterophoridae that is endemic to Kyrgyzstan.

The wingspan is 16–20 millimetres (0.63–0.79 in).
