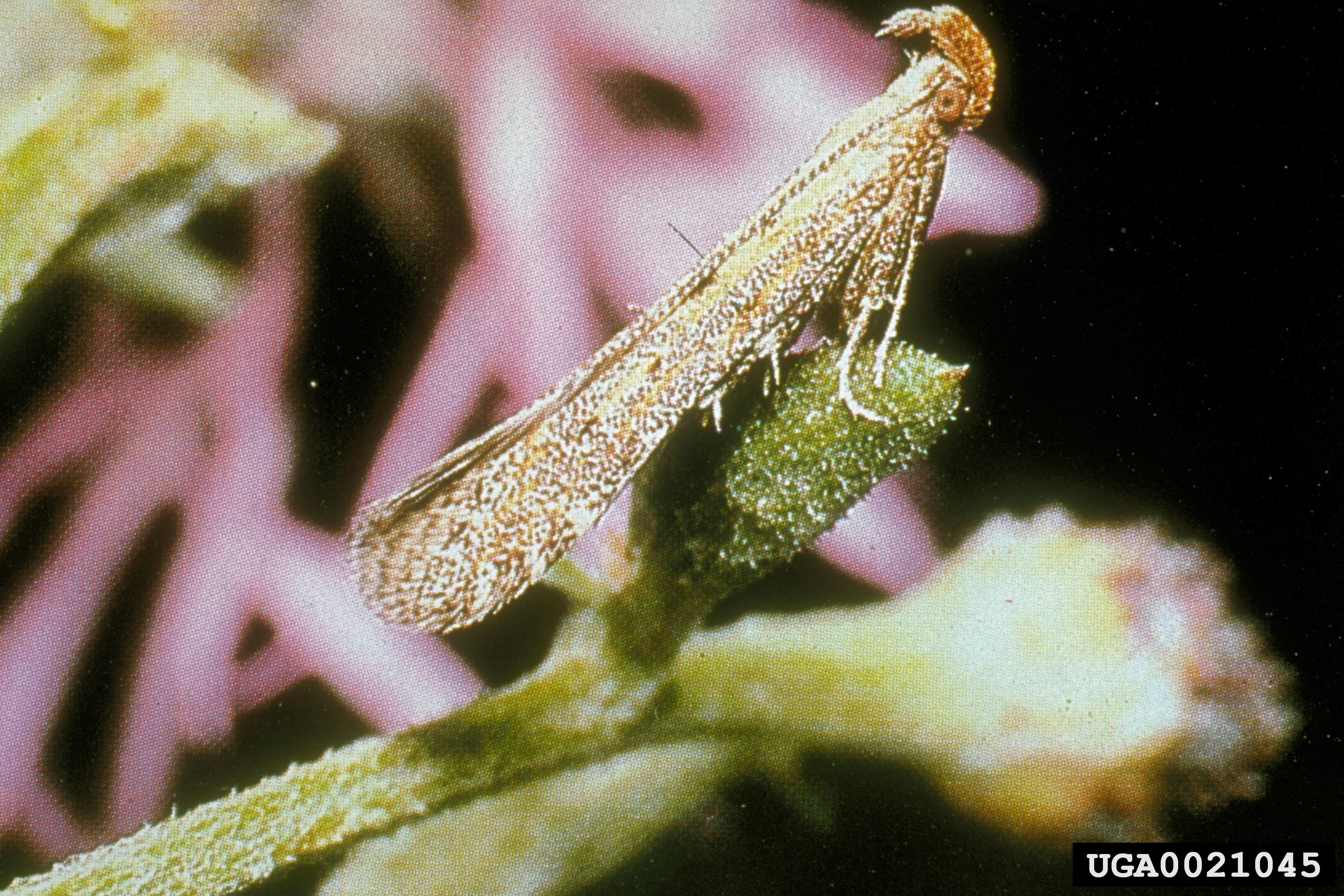
- Metzneria paucipunctella

Scientific classification
- Kingdom: Animalia
- Phylum: Arthropoda
- Clade: Pancrustacea
- Class: Insecta
- Order: Lepidoptera
- Family: Gelechiidae
- Subfamily: Anomologinae
- Genus: Metzneria; Zeller, 1839

Species
- many, see text

Synonyms
- Cleodora Stephens, 1834 (preocc. Péron & Lesueur, 1810); Parasia Duponchel, 1846; Archimetzneria Amsel, 1936

= Metzneria =

Genus of moths

Metzneria is a genus of moths in the family Gelechiidae, described by Philipp Christoph Zeller in 1839.

== Species ==
- Metzneria acrena (Meyrick, 1908)
- Metzneria aestivella (Zeller, 1839)
- Metzneria agraphella (Ragonot, 1895)
- Metzneria albiramosella (Christoph, 1885)
- Metzneria aprilella (Herrich-Schaffer, 1854)
- Metzneria artificella (Herrich-Schaffer, 1861)
- Metzneria asiatica Piskunov, 1979
- Metzneria aspretella Lederer, 1869
- Metzneria brandbergi Janse, 1963
- Metzneria campicolella (Mann, 1857)
- Metzneria canella Caradja, 1920
- Metzneria castiliella (Moschler, 1866)
- Metzneria clitella Rebel, 1903
- Metzneria diamondi Amsel, 1949
- Metzneria diffusella Englert, 1974
- Metzneria ehikeella Gozmany, 1954
- Metzneria englerti Piskunov, 1979
- Metzneria expositoi Vives, 2001
- Metzneria filia Piskunov, 1979
- Metzneria hastella Chrétien, 1915
- Metzneria heptacentra Meyrick, 1911
- Metzneria hilarella Caradja, 1920
- Metzneria inflammatella (Christoph, 1882)
- Metzneria intestinella (Mann, 1864)
- Metzneria ivannikovi Piskunov, 1979
- Metzneria kerzhneri Piskunov, 1979
- Metzneria lacrimosa (Meyrick, 1913)
- Metzneria lappella (Linnaeus, 1758) – burdock seedhead moth
- Metzneria lepigrei Lucas, 1935
- Metzneria littorella (Douglas, 1850)
- Metzneria mendica Piskunov, 1979
- Metzneria metzneriella (Stainton, 1851)
- Metzneria montana Piskunov, 1979
- Metzneria neuropterella (Zeller, 1839)
- Metzneria paucipunctella (Zeller, 1839)
- Metzneria portieri Viette, 1948
- Metzneria riadella Englert, 1974
- Metzneria sanguinea Meyrick, 1934
- Metzneria santolinella (Amsel, 1936)
- Metzneria staehelinella Englert, 1974
- Metzneria strictella Turati, 1924
- Metzneria subflavella Englert, 1974
- Metzneria talassica Piskunov, 1979
- Metzneria tenuiella (Mann, 1864)
- Metzneria torosulella (Rebel, 1893)
- Metzneria tristella Rebel, 1901
- Metzneria varennei Nel, 1997

== Former species ==
- Metzneria torridella
