= Metzneria campicolella =

Scientific classification
- Domain: Eukaryota
- Kingdom: Animalia
- Phylum: Arthropoda
- Class: Insecta
- Order: Lepidoptera
- Family: Gelechiidae
- Genus: Metzneria
- Species: M. campicolella

Binomial name
- Metzneria campicolella (J. J. Mann, 1857)

Synonyms
- Gelechia campicolella J. J. Mann, 1857; Ptocheuusa campicolella

Species of moth

Metzneria campicolella is a moth of the family Gelechiidae described by Josef Johann Mann in 1857. It is found in Asia Minor, Croatia, Italy, Portugal and on Corsica, Sardinia, Sicily, the Dodecanese Islands, Crete and Cyprus.

The wingspan is about 9 mm. The forewings are white with fine brown dots and black spots forming a triangle in the middle. The hindwings are grey.
