= Merrifieldia cana =

Scientific classification
- Kingdom: Animalia
- Phylum: Arthropoda
- Class: Insecta
- Order: Lepidoptera
- Family: Pterophoridae
- Genus: Merrifieldia
- Species: M. cana

Binomial name
- Merrifieldia cana Arenberger, 1990

Synonyms
- Pterophorus cana Arenberger, 1990

Species of plume moth

Merrifieldia cana is a moth of the family Pterophoridae that is found in Morocco.

The wingspan is about 22 millimetres (0.87 in). The forewings, hindwings and all fringes are grey.

Adults have been recorded in May.
