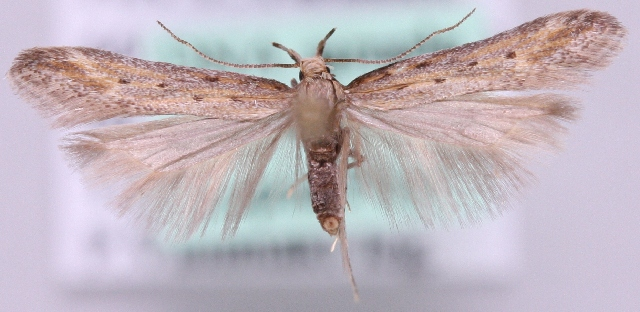

Scientific classification
- Domain: Eukaryota
- Kingdom: Animalia
- Phylum: Arthropoda
- Class: Insecta
- Order: Lepidoptera
- Family: Gelechiidae
- Genus: Metzneria
- Species: M. santolinella

Binomial name
- Metzneria santolinella (Amsel, 1936)

Synonyms
- Archimetzneria santolinella Amsel, 1936; Metzneria consimilella Hackman, 1946

= Metzneria santolinella =

Species of moth

Metzneria santolinella is a moth of the family Gelechiidae. It is widely distributed throughout Europe. Outside of Europe, it is found in Turkey, the Caucasus and Central Asia.

The wingspan is 8–15 mm. Adults are on wing from May to July.

The larvae feed on Anthemis tinctoria.
