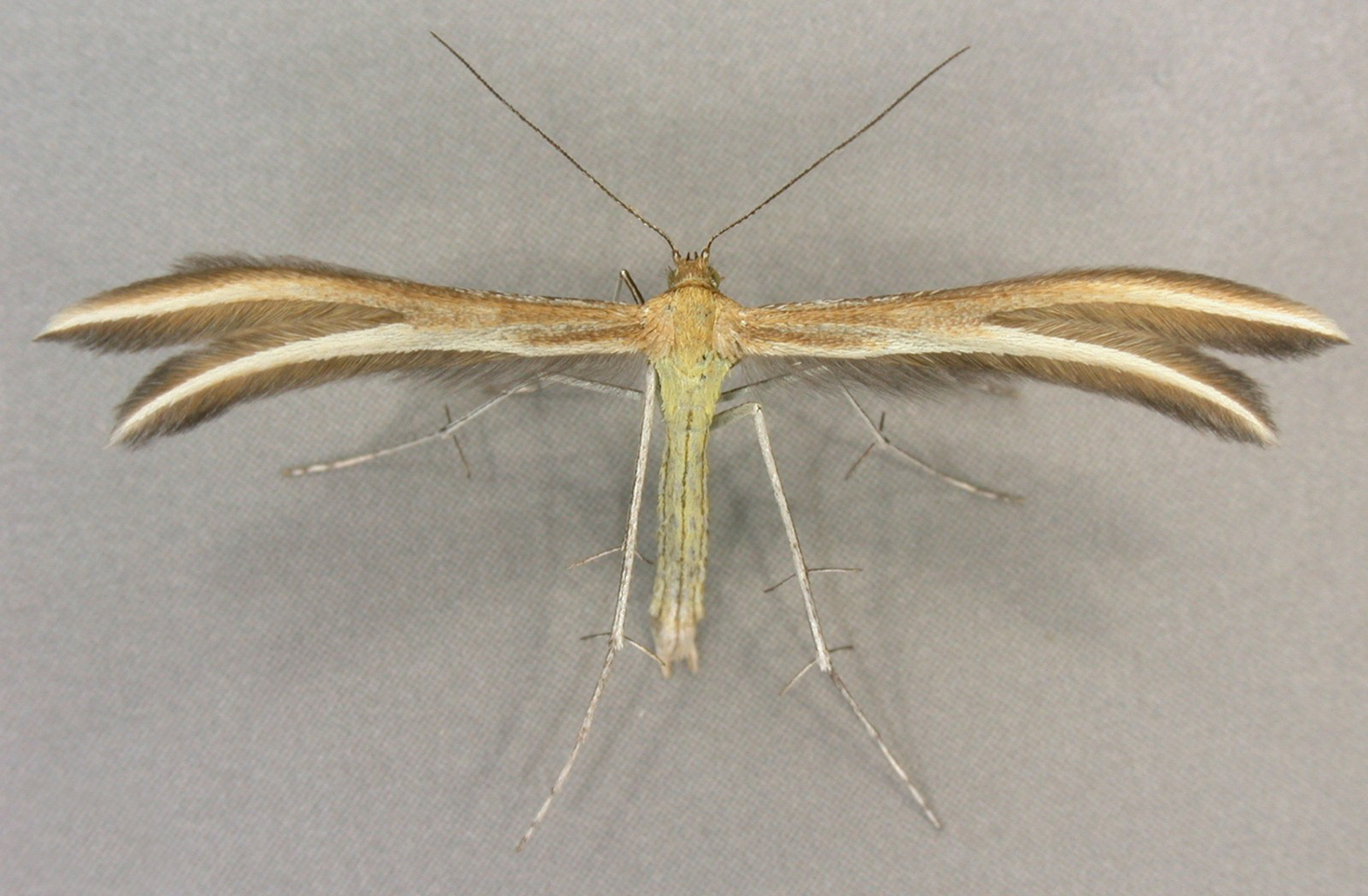

Scientific classification
- Kingdom: Animalia
- Phylum: Arthropoda
- Class: Insecta
- Order: Lepidoptera
- Family: Pterophoridae
- Genus: Merrifieldia
- Species: M. leucodactyla

Binomial name
- Merrifieldia leucodactyla (Denis & Schiffermüller, 1775)

Synonyms
- List: Merrifieldia leucodactylus; Alucita leucodactyla Denis & Schiffermüller, 1775; Alucita leucodactyla Hübner, [1805]; Alucita theiodactyla Hübner, [1825]; Alucita niveidactylus Stephens, 1834; Aciptilia wernickei Wocke, 1897; Alucita fitzi Rebel, 1912; Alucita dryogramma Meyrick, 1930

= Merrifieldia leucodactyla =

Species of plume moth

Merrifieldia leucodactyla, also known as the thyme plume, is a moth of the family Pterophoridae, and is known from most of Europe, as well as North Africa and Asia Minor. It was first described by the Austrian lepidopterists, Michael Denis and Ignaz Schiffermüller in 1775).

== Description ==
Thyme plumes are identified by their distinctive checkered pattern on the antennas, and a finite fuzzy brown line along the entire straw-yellow forewing. The wingspan is 18–25 millimetres (0.71–0.98 in). A close relative, the western thyme plume (Merrifieldia tridactyla) also feeds on thyme and antennae should be checked to confirm identification.

The larvae are green with a white-edged dark green dorsal line. There is a dark green subdorsal line, and yellowish grey spiracular line. The head is yellowish green. The larvae feed the leaves and developing seeds on wild thyme (Thymus serphyllum), wild lungwort (Pulmonaria officinalis) and marjoram (Origanum vulgare). They start to feed in late-July or August, and after overwintering they pupate in the following June or July.
