= Metzneria sanguinea =

Scientific classification
- Kingdom: Animalia
- Phylum: Arthropoda
- Class: Insecta
- Order: Lepidoptera
- Family: Gelechiidae
- Genus: Metzneria
- Species: M. sanguinea

Binomial name
- Metzneria sanguinea Meyrick, 1934

Synonyms
- Metzneria portieri Viette, 1948

Species of moth

Metzneria sanguinea is a moth of the family Gelechiidae. It was described by Edward Meyrick in 1934. It is found in Rwanda, Democratic Republic of Congo and from Ethiopia.
