= Metzneria lacrimosa =

Scientific classification
- Kingdom: Animalia
- Phylum: Arthropoda
- Class: Insecta
- Order: Lepidoptera
- Family: Gelechiidae
- Genus: Metzneria
- Species: M. lacrimosa

Binomial name
- Metzneria lacrimosa (Meyrick, 1913)

Synonyms
- Epithectis lacrimosa Meyrick, 1913

Species of moth

Metzneria lacrimosa is a moth of the family Gelechiidae. It was described by Edward Meyrick in 1913. It is found in Tunisia.
