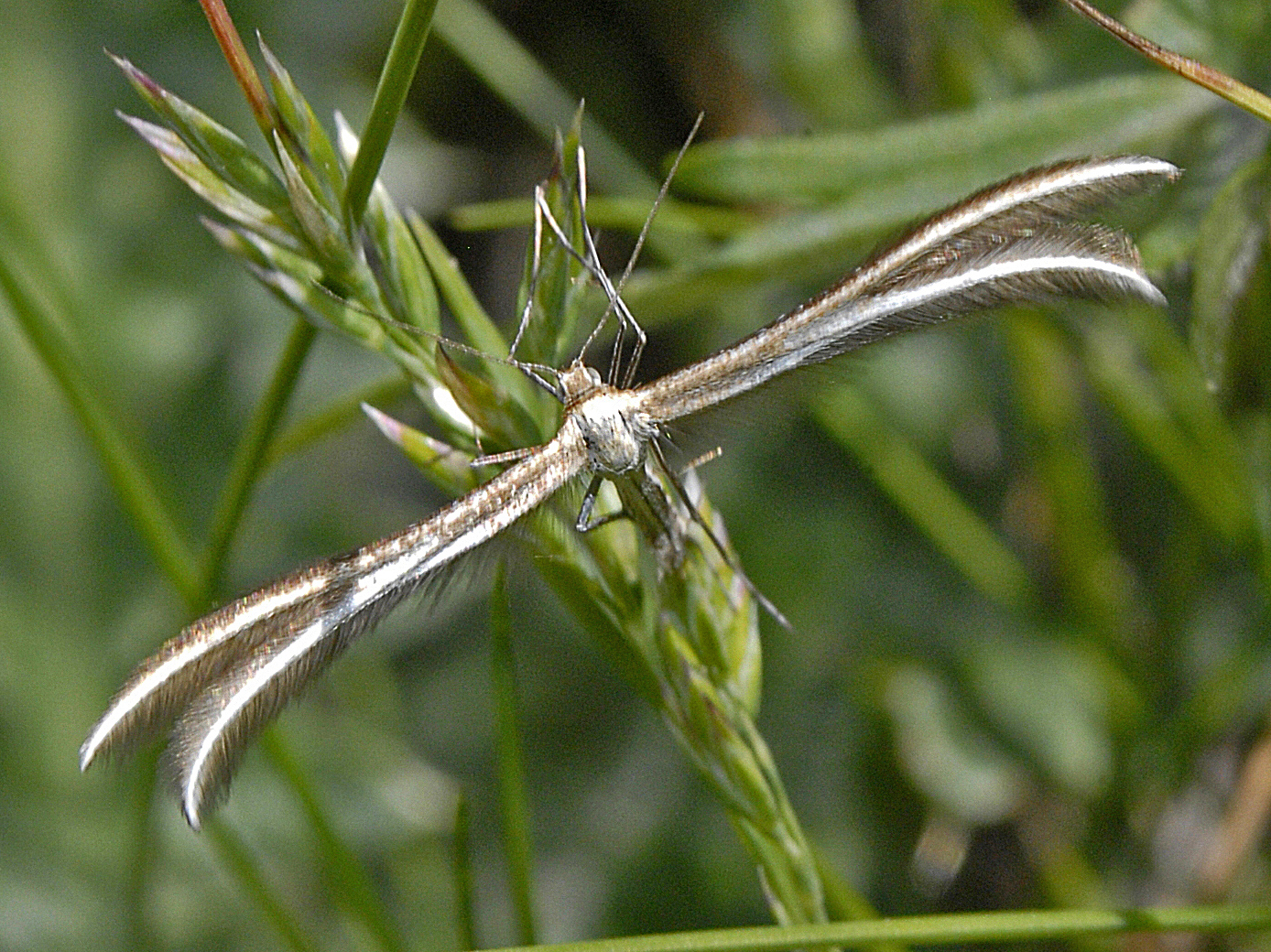
- Merrifieldia species

Scientific classification
- Kingdom: Animalia
- Phylum: Arthropoda
- Clade: Pancrustacea
- Class: Insecta
- Order: Lepidoptera
- Family: Pterophoridae
- Subfamily: Pterophorinae
- Tribe: Pterophorini
- Genus: Merrifieldia; Tutt, 1905

= Merrifieldia =

Plume moth genus

Merrifieldia is a genus of moths in the family Pterophoridae. It has an Old World distribution, with species known from Asia, Africa and Europe.

== Species ==
As of version 1.1.23.125, the Catalogue of the Pterophoroidea of the World lists the following species for genus Merrifieldia:

- Merrifieldia alaica (Caradja, 1920)
- Merrifieldia arenbergeri Ustjuzhanin & Kovtunovich, 2022
- Merrifieldia aurea Ustjuzhanin & Kovtunovich, 2015
- Merrifieldia baliodactylus (Zeller, 1841)
- Merrifieldia brandti (Arenberger, 1981)
- Merrifieldia bystropogonis (Walsingham, 1908)
- Merrifieldia calcarius (Lederer, 1870)
- Merrifieldia cana Arenberger, 1990
- Merrifieldia caspius (Lederer, 1870)
- Merrifieldia chordodactylus (Staudinger, 1859)
- Merrifieldia deprinsi Arenberger, 1990
- Merrifieldia diwani (Arenberger, 1981)
- Merrifieldia farsi (Arenberger, 1981)
- Merrifieldia hedemanni (Rebel, 1896)
- Merrifieldia huberti Arenberger, 1999
- Merrifieldia improvisa Arenberger, 2001
- Merrifieldia innae Kovtunovich & Ustjuzhanin, 2011
- Merrifieldia leucodactyla (Denis & Schiffermüller, 1775)
- Merrifieldia lonnvei Gielis, 2011
- Merrifieldia malacodactylus (Zeller, 1847)
- Merrifieldia nigrocostata Gibeaux, 1997
- Merrifieldia particiliata (Walsingham, 1908)
- Merrifieldia peyroni Bigot & Picard, 2004
- Merrifieldia probolias (Meyrick, 1891)
- Merrifieldia renatae Skyva & Elsner, 2007
- Merrifieldia semiodactylus (Mann, 1855)
- Merrifieldia tridactyla (Linnaeus, 1758)

=== Fossil species ===
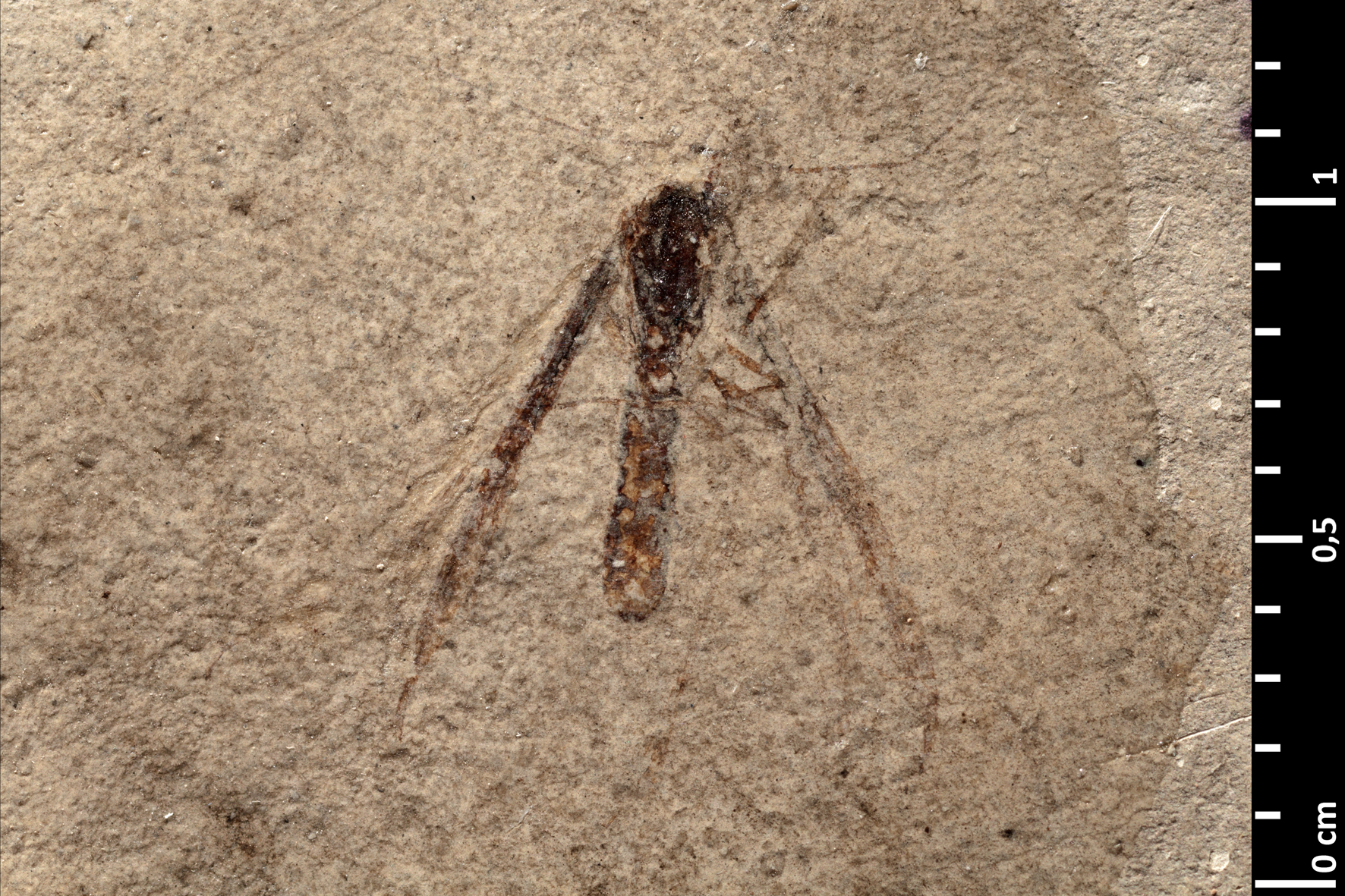
Merrifieldia oligocenicus

- †Merrifieldia oligocenicus (Bigot, Nel & Nel, 1986), formerly Pterophorus oligocenicus, from the late Oligocene–early Miocene boundary.

This species was originally described as Pterophorus oligocenicus, and its authors associated it with what was at the time the tridactyla-spicidactylus group within genus Pterophorus. Although these species were transferred to Merrifieldia as a result of the 1996 revision of Pterophorus sensu lato by Cees Gielis, Pterophorus oligocenicus remained within Pterophorus until it was transferred to Merrifieldia in 2012 by Sohn et al.
