= Metzneria hastella =

Scientific classification
- Domain: Eukaryota
- Kingdom: Animalia
- Phylum: Arthropoda
- Class: Insecta
- Order: Lepidoptera
- Family: Gelechiidae
- Genus: Metzneria
- Species: M. hastella

Binomial name
- Metzneria hastella Chrétien, 1915

Species of moth

Metzneria hastella is a moth of the family Gelechiidae. It was described by Pierre Chrétien in 1915. It is found in Algeria.
