= Merrifieldia brandti =

Scientific classification
- Kingdom: Animalia
- Phylum: Arthropoda
- Class: Insecta
- Order: Lepidoptera
- Family: Pterophoridae
- Genus: Merrifieldia
- Species: M. brandti

Binomial name
- Merrifieldia brandti (Arenberger, 1981)

Synonyms
- Pterophorus brandti Arenberger, 1981

Species of plume moth

Merrifieldia brandti or Pterophorus brandti is a moth of the family Pterophoridae that is endemic Iran (including Miyan Kotal).

The wingspan is 16–17 millimetres (0.63–0.67 in).
