= Metzneria asiatica =

Scientific classification
- Kingdom: Animalia
- Phylum: Arthropoda
- Clade: Pancrustacea
- Class: Insecta
- Order: Lepidoptera
- Family: Gelechiidae
- Genus: Metzneria
- Species: M. asiatica

Binomial name
- Metzneria asiatica Piskunov, 1979

Species of moth

Metzneria asiatica is a moth of the family Gelechiidae. It was described by Piskunov in 1979. It is found in Central Asia.
