= Metzneria artificella =

Scientific classification
- Domain: Eukaryota
- Kingdom: Animalia
- Phylum: Arthropoda
- Class: Insecta
- Order: Lepidoptera
- Family: Gelechiidae
- Genus: Metzneria
- Species: M. artificella

Binomial name
- Metzneria artificella (Herrich-Schäffer, 1861)

Synonyms
- Anacampsis artificella Herrich-Schäffer, 1861; Parasia litigiosella Millière, 1879; Metzneria pannonicella Rebel, 1915

Species of moth

Metzneria artificella is a moth of the family Gelechiidae. It is found from southern and eastern Europe to the southern Ural and the Volga region. It is also found in Iran and southern Siberia.
