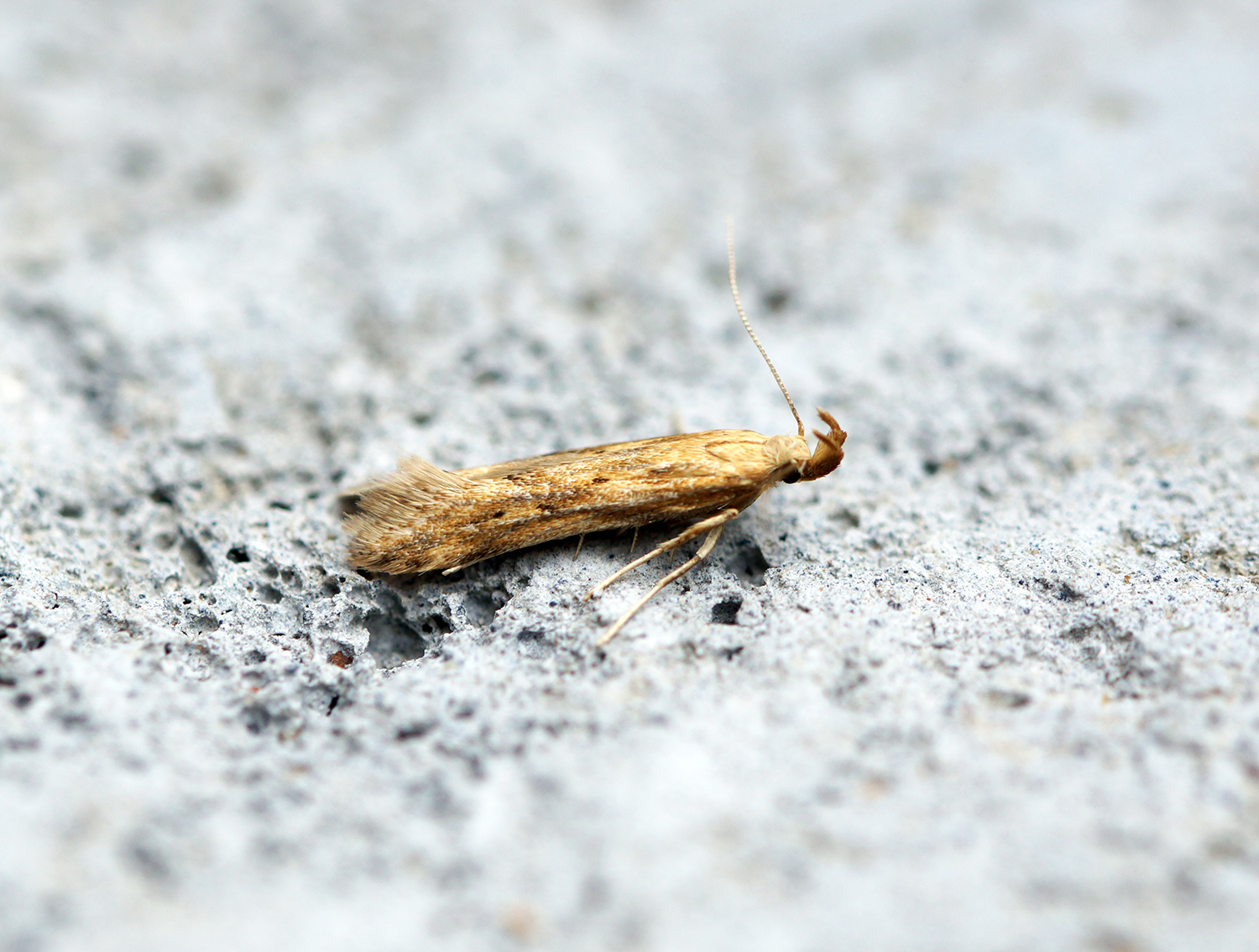

Scientific classification
- Kingdom: Animalia
- Phylum: Arthropoda
- Clade: Pancrustacea
- Class: Insecta
- Order: Lepidoptera
- Family: Gelechiidae
- Genus: Metzneria
- Species: M. metzneriella

Binomial name
- Metzneria metzneriella (Stainton, 1851)

Synonyms
- Gelechia metzneriella Stainton, 1851; Cleodora ochroleucella Stephens, 1834; Parasia falcatella Bruand, 1859

= Metzneria metzneriella =

Species of moth

Metzneria metzneriella is a moth of the family Gelechiidae. It is widely distributed throughout Europe, as well as Turkey and southern Siberia. The habitat consists of dry pastures and calcareous soils.

The wingspan is 14–19 mm. Terminal joint of palpi thick, half second. Forewings are pale yellow-ochreous, towards costa reddish-ochreous; margins and veins more or less suffused with grey, sprinkled with dark fuscous; stigmata black, first discal much beyond plical. Hindwings are grey. The larva is yellow-whitish; head and plate of 2 dark fuscous.

Adults are on wing from June to August.

The larvae feed on the seeds of Centaurea jacea, Centaurea phrygia and Centaurea scabiosa. The species overwinters within the seedhead. Pupation takes place in late spring.
