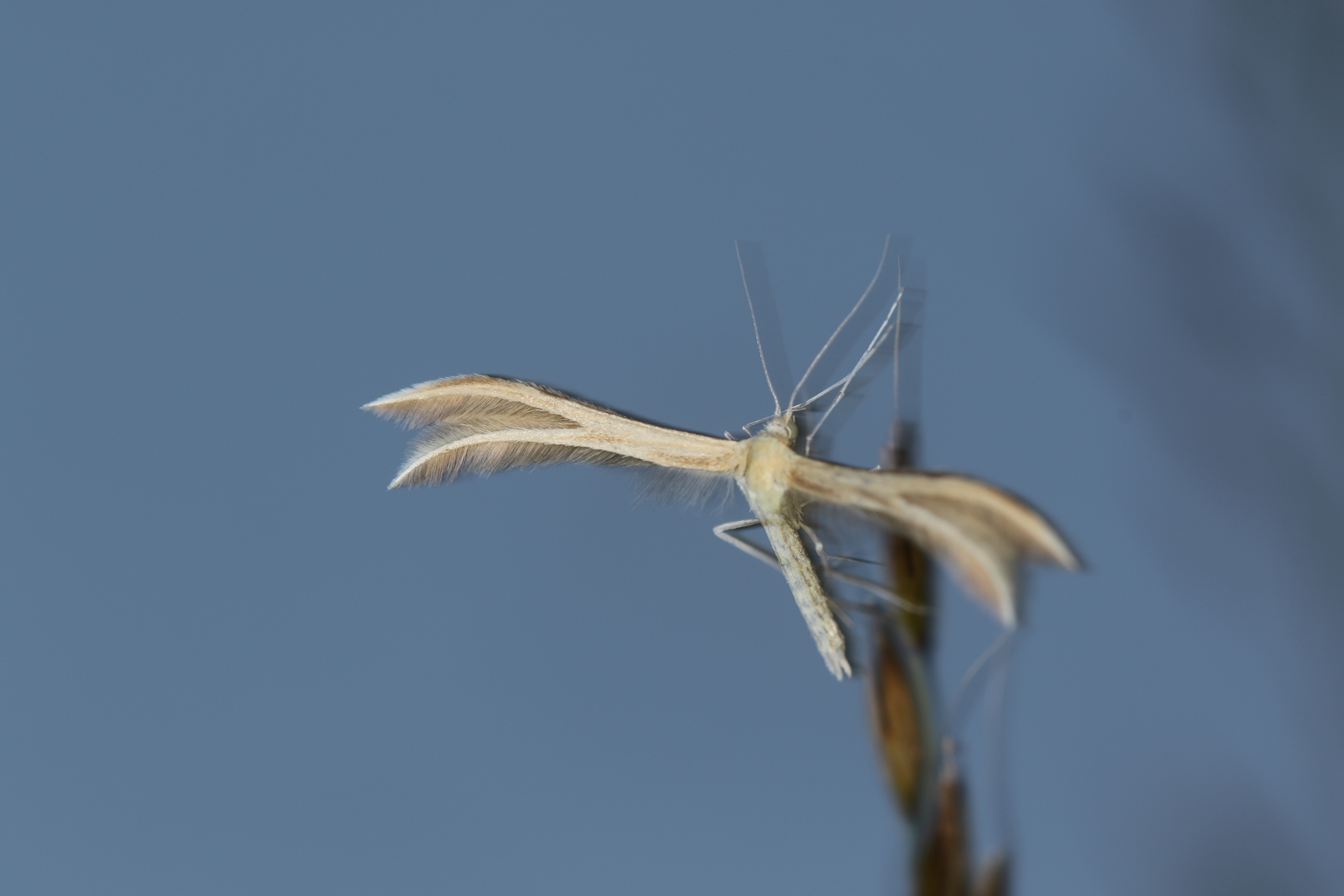

Scientific classification
- Kingdom: Animalia
- Phylum: Arthropoda
- Class: Insecta
- Order: Lepidoptera
- Family: Pterophoridae
- Genus: Merrifieldia
- Species: M. baliodactylus

Binomial name
- Merrifieldia baliodactylus (Zeller, 1841)

Synonyms
- Merrifieldia baliodactyla; Pterophorus baliodactylus Zeller, 1841; Alucita tridactylus Stephens, 1834; Pterophorus daliodactilus Bruand, 1850

= Merrifieldia baliodactylus =

Species of plume moth

Merrifieldia baliodactylus, also known as the dingy white plume, is a moth of the family Pterophoridae found in most of Europe. It was first described by the German entomologist, Philipp Christoph Zeller in 1841.

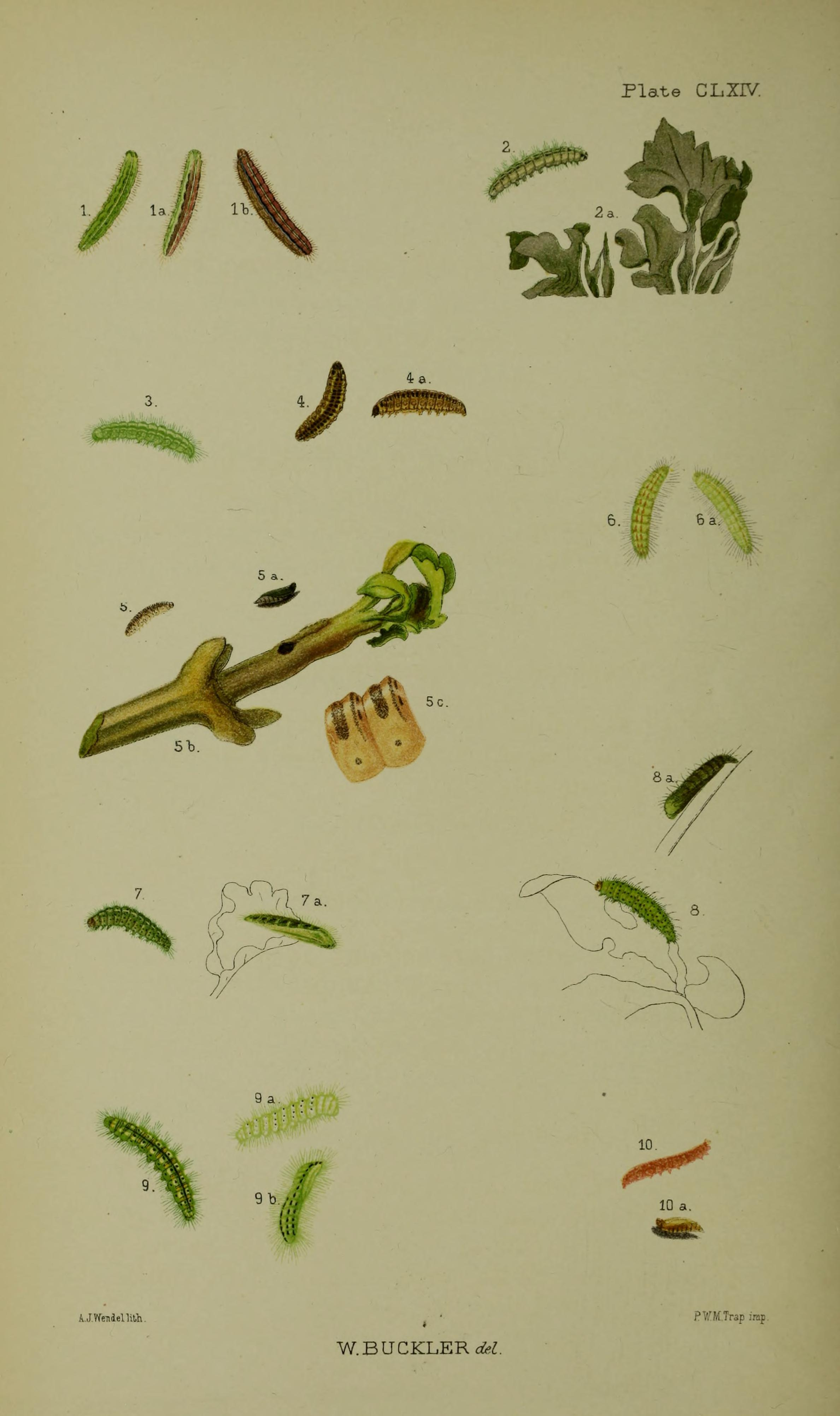
Fig. 8 larva after final moult 8a pupa

The wingspan is 20–27 millimetres (0.79–1.06 in). Adults are on wing from July to August in one generation in western Europe.

The larvae feed on Oregano (Origanum vulgare), biting through the stem and causing the upper leaves to wilt.
