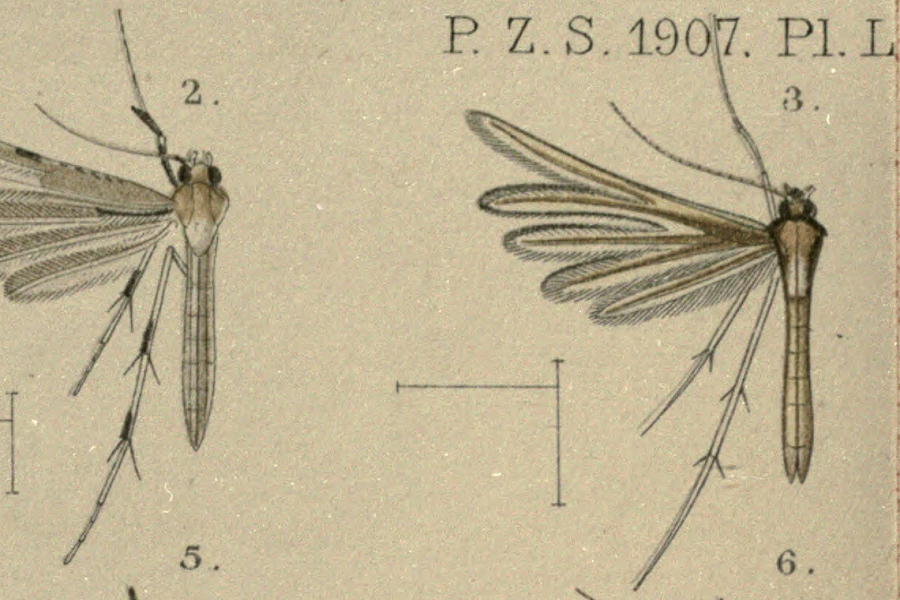

Scientific classification
- Kingdom: Animalia
- Phylum: Arthropoda
- Clade: Pancrustacea
- Class: Insecta
- Order: Lepidoptera
- Family: Pterophoridae
- Genus: Merrifieldia
- Species: M. particiliata

Binomial name
- Merrifieldia particiliata (Walsingham, 1908)

Synonyms
- Alucita particiliata Walsingham, 1908

= Merrifieldia particiliata =

Species of plume moth

Merrifieldia particiliata is a moth of the family Pterophoridae that is endemic to the Canary Islands.

The wingspan is 20–22 millimetres (0.79–0.87 in). The head, thorax, forewings and hindwings are brownish ochreous.
