= Metzneria castiliella =

Scientific classification
- Domain: Eukaryota
- Kingdom: Animalia
- Phylum: Arthropoda
- Class: Insecta
- Order: Lepidoptera
- Family: Gelechiidae
- Genus: Metzneria
- Species: M. castiliella

Binomial name
- Metzneria castiliella (Möschler, 1866)

Synonyms
- Parasia castiliella Möschler, 1866; Metzneria eatoni Walsingham, 1899

Species of moth

Metzneria castiliella is a moth of the family Gelechiidae. It was described by Heinrich Benno Möschler in 1866. It is found in Portugal, Spain, on Malta, the Canary Islands, in North Africa, on Crete, Cyprus and in Palestine.

The wingspan is 14–15 mm. The forewings are bluish-white, lined and sprinkled with fuscous and with a short light brownish-ochreous subcostal streak from the base to about one-sixth, another of the same length opposite to it along the dorsum and a strong oblique ante-terminal streak of the same colour not reaching the margins. On the disc before the middle is a short dark fuscous streak accompanied by a few ochreous scales, a shorter streak occurring below it on the fold, also touched with ochreous. Beneath and before this are two smaller streaks below the fold, the sprinkling of fuscous scales, evenly distributed between these streaks and the remainder of the wing, has a tendency to break into oblique patches along the outer fourth of the costa and on the basal half of the white terminal cilia, which are tipped with pale ochreous. The hindwings are rosy-grey.
