= Metzneria englerti =

Scientific classification
- Kingdom: Animalia
- Phylum: Arthropoda
- Clade: Pancrustacea
- Class: Insecta
- Order: Lepidoptera
- Family: Gelechiidae
- Genus: Metzneria
- Species: M. englerti

Binomial name
- Metzneria englerti Piskunov, 1979

Species of moth

Metzneria englerti is a moth of the family Gelechiidae. It was described by Piskunov in 1979. It is found in Kazakhstan.
