= Metzneria tristella =

Scientific classification
- Kingdom: Animalia
- Phylum: Arthropoda
- Clade: Pancrustacea
- Class: Insecta
- Order: Lepidoptera
- Family: Gelechiidae
- Genus: Metzneria
- Species: M. tristella

Binomial name
- Metzneria tristella Rebel, 1901

Synonyms
- Metzneria (Parasia) tristella Rebel, 1901

Species of moth

Metzneria tristella is a moth of the family Gelechiidae. It was described by Hans Rebel in 1901. It is found in Portugal, Spain and France.

The wingspan is 12–16 mm. The forewings are densely covered with grey scales, which is only lacking at the base and in a variable streak. Here, the colour is ochreous-yellow. The hindwings are dark grey.
