= Metzneria subflavella =

Scientific classification
- Domain: Eukaryota
- Kingdom: Animalia
- Phylum: Arthropoda
- Class: Insecta
- Order: Lepidoptera
- Family: Gelechiidae
- Genus: Metzneria
- Species: M. subflavella

Binomial name
- Metzneria subflavella Englert, 1974

Species of moth

Metzneria subflavella is a moth of the family Gelechiidae. It was described by Englert in 1974. It is found in Portugal, Spain, France, Italy, Hungary, Ukraine, Russia, Iran and Slovakia.
