= Merrifieldia nigrocostata =

Scientific classification
- Kingdom: Animalia
- Phylum: Arthropoda
- Clade: Pancrustacea
- Class: Insecta
- Order: Lepidoptera
- Family: Pterophoridae
- Genus: Merrifieldia
- Species: M. nigrocostata

Binomial name
- Merrifieldia nigrocostata Gibeaux, 1997

Species of plume moth

Merrifieldia nigrocostata is a moth of the family Pterophoridae.
