= Merrifieldia probolias =

Scientific classification
- Kingdom: Animalia
- Phylum: Arthropoda
- Class: Insecta
- Order: Lepidoptera
- Family: Pterophoridae
- Genus: Merrifieldia
- Species: M. probolias

Binomial name
- Merrifieldia probolias (Meyrick, 1891)

Synonyms
- Pterophorus probolias Meyrick, 1891

Species of plume moth

Merrifieldia probolias is a moth of the family Pterophoridae that is found in Tunisia.
