= Metzneria inflammatella =

Scientific classification
- Domain: Eukaryota
- Kingdom: Animalia
- Phylum: Arthropoda
- Class: Insecta
- Order: Lepidoptera
- Family: Gelechiidae
- Genus: Metzneria
- Species: M. inflammatella

Binomial name
- Metzneria inflammatella (Christoph, 1882)

Synonyms
- Parasia inflammatella Christoph, 1882

Species of moth

Metzneria inflammatella is a moth of the family Gelechiidae. It was described by Hugo Theodor Christoph in 1882. It is found in the Russian Far East (Amur).
