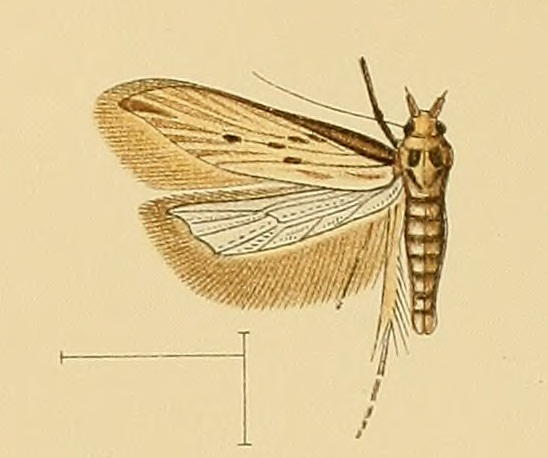

Scientific classification
- Domain: Eukaryota
- Kingdom: Animalia
- Phylum: Arthropoda
- Class: Insecta
- Order: Lepidoptera
- Family: Gelechiidae
- Genus: Metzneria
- Species: M. torosulella

Binomial name
- Metzneria torosulella (Rebel, 1893)

Synonyms
- Parasia torosulella Rebel, 1893; Metzneria monochroa Walsingham, 1907; Metzneria ignota Turati, 1922

= Metzneria torosulella =

Species of moth

Metzneria torosulella is a moth of the family Gelechiidae. It is found in Portugal, Spain, Croatia, Cyprus, as well as on Malta, Sardinia and the Canary Islands. It is also found in Tunisia and Libya.

The wingspan is about 22 mm. The forewings are pale ochreous yellow with brownish markings. The hindwings are dark grey.
