= Merrifieldia innae =

Scientific classification
- Kingdom: Animalia
- Phylum: Arthropoda
- Class: Insecta
- Order: Lepidoptera
- Family: Pterophoridae
- Genus: Merrifieldia
- Species: M. innae

Binomial name
- Merrifieldia innae Kovtunovich & Ustjuzhanin, 2011

Species of plume moth

Merrifieldia innae is a moth of the family Pterophoridae that is found in Lesotho.
