= Metzneria talassica =

Scientific classification
- Kingdom: Animalia
- Phylum: Arthropoda
- Clade: Pancrustacea
- Class: Insecta
- Order: Lepidoptera
- Family: Gelechiidae
- Genus: Metzneria
- Species: M. talassica

Binomial name
- Metzneria talassica Piskunov, 1979

Species of moth

Metzneria talassica is a moth of the family Gelechiidae. It was first described by V.I Piskunov in 1979. It is found in Kazakhstan.
