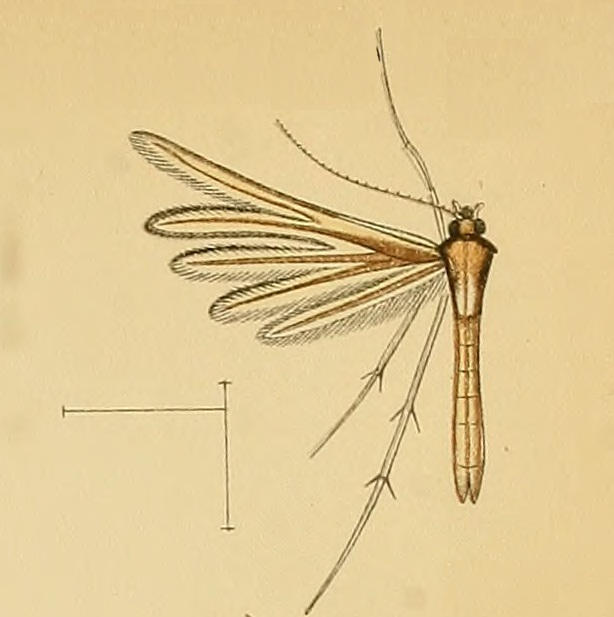

Scientific classification
- Kingdom: Animalia
- Phylum: Arthropoda
- Class: Insecta
- Order: Lepidoptera
- Family: Pterophoridae
- Genus: Merrifieldia
- Species: M. chordodactylus

Binomial name
- Merrifieldia chordodactylus (Staudinger, 1859)

Synonyms
- Pterophorus chordodactylus Staudinger, 1859

= Merrifieldia chordodactylus =

Species of plume moth

Merrifieldia chordodactylus is a moth of the family Pterophoridae. It is found on the Canary Islands and in Spain. It has also been recorded from Algeria and Morocco.

The wingspan is 20–21 millimetres (0.79–0.83 in).

The larvae possibly feed on Lavandula abrotanoides and fernleaf lavender (Lavandula multifida).
