= Metzneria diamondi =

Scientific classification
- Domain: Eukaryota
- Kingdom: Animalia
- Phylum: Arthropoda
- Class: Insecta
- Order: Lepidoptera
- Family: Gelechiidae
- Genus: Metzneria
- Species: M. diamondi

Binomial name
- Metzneria diamondi Amsel, 1949

Species of moth

Metzneria diamondi is a moth of the family Gelechiidae. It is found in Iraq.
