= Metzneria strictella =

Scientific classification
- Kingdom: Animalia
- Phylum: Arthropoda
- Class: Insecta
- Order: Lepidoptera
- Family: Gelechiidae
- Genus: Metzneria
- Species: M. strictella

Binomial name
- Metzneria strictella Turati, 1924

Species of moth

Metzneria strictella is a moth of the family Gelechiidae. It was described by Turati in 1924. It is found in Libya.
