= Merrifieldia deprinsi =

Scientific classification
- Kingdom: Animalia
- Phylum: Arthropoda
- Clade: Pancrustacea
- Class: Insecta
- Order: Lepidoptera
- Family: Pterophoridae
- Genus: Merrifieldia
- Species: M. deprinsi

Binomial name
- Merrifieldia deprinsi Arenberger, 1990

Synonyms
- Pterophorus deprinsi Arenberger, 1990

Species of plume moth

Merrifieldia deprinsi is a moth of the family Pterophoridae that is found in Asia Minor.

The wingspan is about 21 millimetres (0.83 in).

Adults have been recorded in August.
