= Metzneria aspretella =

Scientific classification
- Domain: Eukaryota
- Kingdom: Animalia
- Phylum: Arthropoda
- Class: Insecta
- Order: Lepidoptera
- Family: Gelechiidae
- Genus: Metzneria
- Species: M. aspretella

Binomial name
- Metzneria aspretella Lederer, 1869

Synonyms
- Parasia obsoleta Christoph, 1888

Species of moth

Metzneria aspretella is a moth of the family Gelechiidae. It was described by Julius Lederer in 1869. It is found in Transcaspia, northern Iran and Palestine.
