= Metzneria lepigrei =

Scientific classification
- Domain: Eukaryota
- Kingdom: Animalia
- Phylum: Arthropoda
- Class: Insecta
- Order: Lepidoptera
- Family: Gelechiidae
- Genus: Metzneria
- Species: M. lepigrei

Binomial name
- Metzneria lepigrei D. Lucas, 1935

Species of moth

Metzneria lepigrei is a moth of the family Gelechiidae. It was described by Daniel Lucas in 1935. It is found in Algeria.
