= Merrifieldia tridactyla =

Scientific classification
- Kingdom: Animalia
- Phylum: Arthropoda
- Class: Insecta
- Order: Lepidoptera
- Family: Pterophoridae
- Genus: Merrifieldia
- Species: M. tridactyla

Binomial name
- Merrifieldia tridactyla (Linnaeus, 1758)

Synonyms
- List: Merrifieldia tridactylus; Phalaena Alucita tridactyla Linnaeus, 1758; Pterophorus fuscolimbatus Duponchel, 1844; Pterophorus icterodactylus Mann, 1855; Alucita icterodactyla ab. noctis Caradja, 1920; Alucita spicidactyla flavella Chrétien, 1923; Alucita baliodactyla menthae Chrétien, 1925; Alucita icterodactyla philippsi Huggins, 1955; Aciptilia exilidactyla Buszko, 1975; Merrifieldia neli Bigot & Picard, 1989

Species of plume moth

Merrifieldia tridactyla, also known as the western thyme plume, is a moth of the family Pterophoridae, first described by Carl Linnaeus in his 10th edition of Systema Naturae in 1758. It is known from most of Europe, as well as North Africa and Asia Minor.

== Description ==
The wingspan is 18–23 millimetres (0.71–0.91 in). It is very similar to Merrifieldia leucodactyla Certain identification requires examination of the genitalia.

Adults are on wing from June to July in western Europe.

The larvae feed on Thymus species, including Breckland thyme (Thymus serpyllum) and common thyme (Thymus vulgaris), and mint (Mentha species) in Europe. In Saudi Arabia, larvae have been recorded feeding on the fruits of Cucurbita moschata.
