= Merrifieldia calcarius =

Scientific classification
- Kingdom: Animalia
- Phylum: Arthropoda
- Class: Insecta
- Order: Lepidoptera
- Family: Pterophoridae
- Genus: Merrifieldia
- Species: M. calcarius

Binomial name
- Merrifieldia calcarius (Lederer, 1870)

Synonyms
- Pterophorus calcarius Lederer, 1870; Merrifieldia calcaria

Species of plume moth

Merrifieldia calcarius is a moth of the family Pterophoridae. It is found in eastern Russia, Turkmenistan, Iran and Turkey.
