= Lutilabria kaszabi =

Scientific classification
- Kingdom: Animalia
- Phylum: Arthropoda
- Clade: Pancrustacea
- Class: Insecta
- Order: Lepidoptera
- Family: Gelechiidae
- Genus: Lutilabria
- Species: L. kaszabi

Binomial name
- Lutilabria kaszabi Povolný, 1978

Species of moth

Lutilabria kaszabi is a moth in the family Gelechiidae. It was described by Povolný in 1978. It is found in Mongolia.
