= Merrifieldia caspius =

Scientific classification
- Kingdom: Animalia
- Phylum: Arthropoda
- Class: Insecta
- Order: Lepidoptera
- Family: Pterophoridae
- Genus: Merrifieldia
- Species: M. caspius

Binomial name
- Merrifieldia caspius (Lederer, 1870)

Synonyms
- Pterophorus caspius Lederer, 1870; Merrifieldia caspia

Species of plume moth

Merrifieldia caspius is a moth of the family Pterophoridae that is found in Russia, Kyrgyzstan Iran, Afghanistan, Turkey and India.
