= Asalebria geminella =

Scientific classification
- Domain: Eukaryota
- Kingdom: Animalia
- Phylum: Arthropoda
- Class: Insecta
- Order: Lepidoptera
- Family: Pyralidae
- Genus: Asalebria
- Species: A. geminella

Binomial name
- Asalebria geminella (Eversmann, 1844)

Synonyms
- Myelophila geminella Eversmann, 1844; Pempelia geminella

Species of moth

Asalebria geminella is a species of snout moth belonging to the genus Asalebria. It was originally described by Eduard Friedrich Eversmann in 1844. This moth species is found in several countries, including Spain, Portugal, Hungary, Russia and Turkey.
