= Lutilabria prolata =

Scientific classification
- Kingdom: Animalia
- Phylum: Arthropoda
- Clade: Pancrustacea
- Class: Insecta
- Order: Lepidoptera
- Family: Gelechiidae
- Genus: Lutilabria
- Species: L. prolata

Binomial name
- Lutilabria prolata Junnilainen & Nupponen, 2010

Species of moth

Lutilabria prolata is a moth of the family Gelechiidae. It is found in Russia (the southern Ural) and Romania. The habitat consists of steppe.

The wingspan is about 18.5 mm. Adults are on wing in late May and early June.
