= Metzneria clitella =

Scientific classification
- Domain: Eukaryota
- Kingdom: Animalia
- Phylum: Arthropoda
- Class: Insecta
- Order: Lepidoptera
- Family: Gelechiidae
- Genus: Metzneria
- Species: M. clitella

Binomial name
- Metzneria clitella Rebel, 1903

Synonyms
- Metzneria tricoloria Turati, 1930

Species of moth

Metzneria clitella is a moth of the family Gelechiidae. It was described by Hans Rebel in 1903. It is found in Libya.
