= Coleophora didymella =

Scientific classification
- Kingdom: Animalia
- Phylum: Arthropoda
- Class: Insecta
- Order: Lepidoptera
- Family: Coleophoridae
- Genus: Coleophora
- Species: C. didymella

Binomial name
- Coleophora didymella Chretien, 1899

Species of moth

Coleophora didymella is a moth of the family Coleophoridae. It is found in southern France and Italy.

The larvae feed on Centaurea scabiosa. Larvae can be found from summer to the next spring.
