= Metzneria hilarella =

Scientific classification
- Domain: Eukaryota
- Kingdom: Animalia
- Phylum: Arthropoda
- Class: Insecta
- Order: Lepidoptera
- Family: Gelechiidae
- Genus: Metzneria
- Species: M. hilarella

Binomial name
- Metzneria hilarella Caradja, 1920

Species of moth

Metzneria hilarella is a moth of the family Gelechiidae. It was described by Aristide Caradja in 1920. It is found in France and Spain.
