= Metzneria diffusella =

Scientific classification
- Domain: Eukaryota
- Kingdom: Animalia
- Phylum: Arthropoda
- Class: Insecta
- Order: Lepidoptera
- Family: Gelechiidae
- Genus: Metzneria
- Species: M. diffusella

Binomial name
- Metzneria diffusella Englert, 1974

Species of moth

Metzneria diffusella is a moth of the family Gelechiidae. It is found in Russia (the southern Ural), France, Spain, Italy, Croatia, Bulgaria and the Near East (Syria).
