= Metzneria acrena =

Scientific classification
- Kingdom: Animalia
- Phylum: Arthropoda
- Clade: Pancrustacea
- Class: Insecta
- Order: Lepidoptera
- Family: Gelechiidae
- Genus: Metzneria
- Species: M. acrena

Binomial name
- Metzneria acrena (Meyrick, 1908)

Synonyms
- Aristotelia acrena Meyrick, 1908

Species of moth

Metzneria acrena is a moth of the family Gelechiidae. It was described by Edward Meyrick in 1908. It is found in Namibia and South Africa, where it has been recorded from the Limpopo.

The wingspan is about 12 mm. The forewings are whitish ochreous somewhat sprinkled with fuscous and with some deep ochreous-yellow suffusion forming streaks beneath the costa and along the submedian fold, and a broad patch occupying most of the postmedian area except for a narrow terminal fuscous fascia sprinkled with dark fuscous. There is a blackish dot at the base of the costa, two beneath the costa at one-fifth and two-fifths, two on the fold obliquely beyond these respectively, one in the disc beyond the middle, and one at two-thirds. The hindwings are grey.
