= Merrifieldia farsi =

Scientific classification
- Kingdom: Animalia
- Phylum: Arthropoda
- Class: Insecta
- Order: Lepidoptera
- Family: Pterophoridae
- Genus: Merrifieldia
- Species: M. farsi

Binomial name
- Merrifieldia farsi (Arenberger, 1981)

Synonyms
- Pterophorus farsi Arenberger, 1981

Species of plume moth

Merrifieldia farsi is a moth of the family Pterophoridae described by Ernst Arenberger in 1981. It is found in Azerbaijan and Iran.

The wingspan is 23–25 millimetres (0.91–0.98 in). The ground colour is dirty white. Adults have been recorded in June.
