= Merrifieldia alaica =

Scientific classification
- Kingdom: Animalia
- Phylum: Arthropoda
- Class: Insecta
- Order: Lepidoptera
- Family: Pterophoridae
- Genus: Merrifieldia
- Species: M. alaica

Binomial name
- Merrifieldia alaica (Caradja, 1920)

Synonyms
- Alucita alaica Caradja, 1920

Species of plume moth

Merrifieldia alaica is a moth of the family Pterophoridae that is found in Kyrgyzstan, Russia and Afghanistan. The species was first described by Aristide Caradja in 1920.
