= Metzneria albiramosella =

Scientific classification
- Domain: Eukaryota
- Kingdom: Animalia
- Phylum: Arthropoda
- Class: Insecta
- Order: Lepidoptera
- Family: Gelechiidae
- Genus: Metzneria
- Species: M. albiramosella

Binomial name
- Metzneria albiramosella (Christoph, 1885)

Synonyms
- Parasia albiramosella Christoph, 1885

Species of moth

Metzneria albiramosella is a moth of the family Gelechiidae. It was described by Hugo Theodor Christoph in 1885. It is found in Turkmenistan.
