= Metzneria heptacentra =

Scientific classification
- Kingdom: Animalia
- Phylum: Arthropoda
- Class: Insecta
- Order: Lepidoptera
- Family: Gelechiidae
- Genus: Metzneria
- Species: M. heptacentra

Binomial name
- Metzneria heptacentra Meyrick, 1911

Species of moth

Metzneria heptacentra is a moth of the family Gelechiidae. It was described by Edward Meyrick in 1911. It is found in Zimbabwe and South Africa, where it has been recorded from the North-West Province, Gauteng, Mpumalanga, Limpopo and the Orange Free State.

The wingspan is 12–13 mm. The forewings are whitish ochreous, thinly sprinkled with brownish and dark fuscous, irregularly suffused with yellow ochreous in the disc and posteriorly. There is a small spot of blackish suffusion on the base of the costa, a dot beneath the costa near the base, and another on the fold beyond this. There is a stronger black dot towards the costa at two-fifths, one on the fold beyond this, one in the disc beyond the middle, and one at two-thirds. There is a narrow suffused dark fuscous fascia along the termen, preceded by a clear yellow-ochreous fascia. The hindwings are dark grey.
