= Lutilabria volgensis =

Scientific classification
- Kingdom: Animalia
- Phylum: Arthropoda
- Clade: Pancrustacea
- Class: Insecta
- Order: Lepidoptera
- Family: Gelechiidae
- Genus: Lutilabria
- Species: L. volgensis

Binomial name
- Lutilabria volgensis Anikin & Piskunov, 1996

Species of moth

Lutilabria volgensis is a moth in the family Gelechiidae. It was described by Anikin and Piskunov in 1996. It is found in Russia (the southern Ural).

The wingspan is about 15 mm (0.59 in). The forewings are rust-brown, without markings. The hindwings are brownish-grey.

== Etymology ==
The species is named for the region where it was first collected.
