= Merrifieldia improvisa =

Scientific classification
- Kingdom: Animalia
- Phylum: Arthropoda
- Class: Insecta
- Order: Lepidoptera
- Family: Pterophoridae
- Genus: Merrifieldia
- Species: M. improvisa

Binomial name
- Merrifieldia improvisa Arenberger, 2001

Species of plume moth

Merrifieldia improvisa is a moth of the family Pterophoridae that is known from Kenya.
