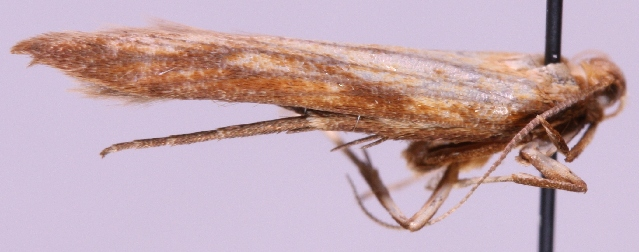

Scientific classification
- Kingdom: Animalia
- Phylum: Arthropoda
- Clade: Pancrustacea
- Class: Insecta
- Order: Lepidoptera
- Family: Gelechiidae
- Genus: Metzneria
- Species: M. neuropterella

Binomial name
- Metzneria neuropterella (Zeller, 1839)

Synonyms
- Gelechia neuropterella Zeller, 1839; Metzneria neuropterella ab. gigantella Krulikovsky, 1908; Metzneria ouedella Caradja, 1920

= Metzneria neuropterella =

Species of moth

Metzneria neuropterella, the brown-veined neb, is a moth of the family Gelechiidae. It is found from most of Europe to the southern Ural Mountains, the Caucasus, southern and south-eastern Siberia and Mongolia, as well as in North Africa. The habitat consist of short-turfed, herb rich chalk downland.

The wingspan is 14–24 mm. Adults are on wing from June to August.

The larvae feed in the seedheads of Cirsium acaule and Centaurea nigra. Larvae can be found from late August onwards and pupation takes place in June.
