= Metzneria filia =

Scientific classification
- Kingdom: Animalia
- Phylum: Arthropoda
- Clade: Pancrustacea
- Class: Insecta
- Order: Lepidoptera
- Family: Gelechiidae
- Genus: Metzneria
- Species: M. filia

Binomial name
- Metzneria filia Piskunov, 1979

Species of moth

Metzneria filia is a moth of the family Gelechiidae. It was described by Vladimir Ivanovich Piskunov in 1979. It is found in the southern part of European Russia and in Kazakhstan.

The larvae feed on Centaurea ruthenica and Centaurea cyanus (Asteraceae).
