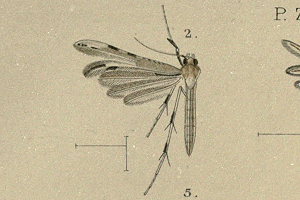

Scientific classification
- Kingdom: Animalia
- Phylum: Arthropoda
- Clade: Pancrustacea
- Class: Insecta
- Order: Lepidoptera
- Family: Pterophoridae
- Genus: Merrifieldia
- Species: M. bystropogonis

Binomial name
- Merrifieldia bystropogonis (Walsingham, 1908)

Synonyms
- Alucita bystropogonis Walsingham, 1908

= Merrifieldia bystropogonis =

Species of plume moth

Merrifieldia bystropogonis is a moth of the family Pterophoridae that is found on the Canary Islands and Madeira.

The wingspan is 16–20 millimetres (0.63–0.79 in).

The larvae feed on Bystropogon plumosus.
