= Lutilabria =

Scientific classification
- Kingdom: Animalia
- Phylum: Arthropoda
- Clade: Pancrustacea
- Class: Insecta
- Order: Lepidoptera
- Family: Gelechiidae
- Tribe: Gnorimoschemini
- Genus: Lutilabria; Povolny, 1965

Genus of moths

Lutilabria is a genus of moths in the family Gelechiidae.

== Species ==
- Lutilabria kaszabi Povolný, 1978
- Lutilabria lutilabrella (Mann, 1857)
- Lutilabria prolata Junnilainen & Nupponen, 2010
- Lutilabria volgensis Anikin & Piskunov, 1996

== Former species ==
- Lutilabria olympica Huemer, 1993
