= Asalebria imitatella =

Scientific classification
- Domain: Eukaryota
- Kingdom: Animalia
- Phylum: Arthropoda
- Class: Insecta
- Order: Lepidoptera
- Family: Pyralidae
- Genus: Asalebria
- Species: A. imitatella

Binomial name
- Asalebria imitatella (Ragonot, 1893)

Synonyms
- Brephia imitatella Ragonot, 1893; Khorassania imitatella

Species of moth

Asalebria imitatella is a species of snout moth in the genus Asalebria. It was described by Ragonot, in 1893, and is known from Russia.

The wingspan is about 22 mm.
