= Asalebria venustella =

Scientific classification
- Domain: Eukaryota
- Kingdom: Animalia
- Phylum: Arthropoda
- Class: Insecta
- Order: Lepidoptera
- Family: Pyralidae
- Genus: Asalebria
- Species: A. venustella

Binomial name
- Asalebria venustella (Ragonot, 1887)

Synonyms
- Salebria venustella Ragonot, 1887

Species of moth

Asalebria venustella is a species of snout moth in the genus Asalebria. It was described by Ragonot, in 1887, and is the type species of its genus. It is found in Portugal, Spain, France, Sardinia, Russia, Kazakhstan and Mongolia.
