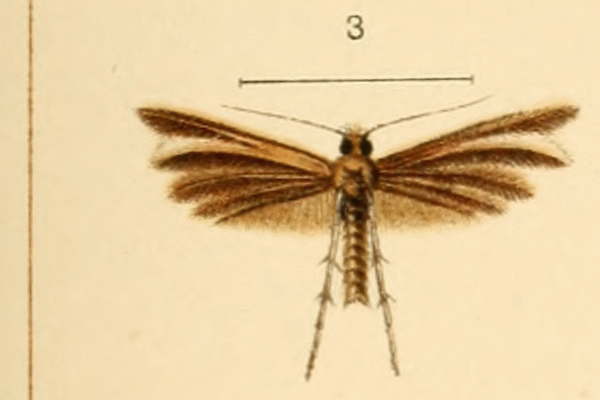

Scientific classification
- Kingdom: Animalia
- Phylum: Arthropoda
- Clade: Pancrustacea
- Class: Insecta
- Order: Lepidoptera
- Family: Pterophoridae
- Genus: Merrifieldia
- Species: M. hedemanni

Binomial name
- Merrifieldia hedemanni (Rebel, 1896)

Synonyms
- Gypsochares hedemanni Rebel, 1896; Alucita hesperidella Walsingham, 1908

= Merrifieldia hedemanni =

Species of plume moth

Merrifieldia hedemanni is a moth of the family Pterophoridae that is endemic to the Canary Islands.

The wingspan is about 15 millimetres (0.59 in).

The larvae feed on Micromeria varia.
