= Metzneria montana =

Scientific classification
- Kingdom: Animalia
- Phylum: Arthropoda
- Clade: Pancrustacea
- Class: Insecta
- Order: Lepidoptera
- Family: Gelechiidae
- Genus: Metzneria
- Species: M. montana

Binomial name
- Metzneria montana Piskunov, 1979

Species of moth

Metzneria montana is a moth of the family Gelechiidae. It was described by Piskunov in 1979. It is found in Turkmenistan.
