= Merrifieldia diwani =

Scientific classification
- Kingdom: Animalia
- Phylum: Arthropoda
- Class: Insecta
- Order: Lepidoptera
- Family: Pterophoridae
- Genus: Merrifieldia
- Species: M. diwani

Binomial name
- Merrifieldia diwani (Arenberger, 1981)

Synonyms
- Pterophorus diwani Arenberger, 1981

Species of plume moth

Merrifieldia diwani is a moth of the family Pterophoridae that is found in Iran.

The wingspan is about 25 millimetres (0.98 in).

Adults have been recorded in May and June.
