= Metzneria agraphella =

Scientific classification
- Domain: Eukaryota
- Kingdom: Animalia
- Phylum: Arthropoda
- Class: Insecta
- Order: Lepidoptera
- Family: Gelechiidae
- Genus: Metzneria
- Species: M. agraphella

Binomial name
- Metzneria agraphella (Ragonot, 1895)

Synonyms
- Parasia agraphella Ragonot, 1895; Metzneria incognita Walsingham, 1904

Species of moth

Metzneria agraphella is a moth of the family Gelechiidae. It was described by Émile Louis Ragonot in 1895. It is found in Algeria, Libya, Asia Minor and Palestine.

The wingspan is 16–18 mm. The forewings are whitish ochreous, with a straight brownish ochreous streak along the cell, and another parallel to it below the costa, produced beyond the cell and diffused upward to the costa before the apex. A broad dark brownish ochreous line runs along the termen, and the cilia are almost entirely suffused with brownish ochreous in which there is only a faint indication of a median line. The hindwings are shining, dark purplish grey.
