= Asalebria =

Scientific classification
- Domain: Eukaryota
- Kingdom: Animalia
- Phylum: Arthropoda
- Class: Insecta
- Order: Lepidoptera
- Family: Pyralidae
- Subfamily: Phycitinae
- Tribe: Phycitini
- Genus: Asalebria; Amsel, 1953

Synonyms
- Exophora Roesler, 1988; Postsalebria Amsel, 1955; Praesalebria Amsel, 1954

Genus of moths

Asalebria is a genus of snout moths. It was erected by Hans Georg Amsel in 1953 and is known from Spain and Russia.

== Species ==
- Asalebria florella
- Asalebria geminella
- Asalebria imitatella
- Asalebria pseudoflorella
- Asalebria venustella
