= Metzneria canella =

Scientific classification
- Domain: Eukaryota
- Kingdom: Animalia
- Phylum: Arthropoda
- Class: Insecta
- Order: Lepidoptera
- Family: Gelechiidae
- Genus: Metzneria
- Species: M. canella

Binomial name
- Metzneria canella Chrétien, 1920

Synonyms
- Metzneria littorella var. canella Chretien, 1920

Species of moth

Metzneria canella is a moth of the family Gelechiidae. It was described by Pierre Chrétien in 1920. It is found in Algeria.
