= Metzneria brandbergi =

Scientific classification
- Domain: Eukaryota
- Kingdom: Animalia
- Phylum: Arthropoda
- Class: Insecta
- Order: Lepidoptera
- Family: Gelechiidae
- Genus: Metzneria
- Species: M. brandbergi

Binomial name
- Metzneria brandbergi Janse, 1963

Species of moth

Metzneria brandbergi is a moth of the family Gelechiidae. It was described by Anthonie Johannes Theodorus Janse in 1963. It is found in Namibia.
