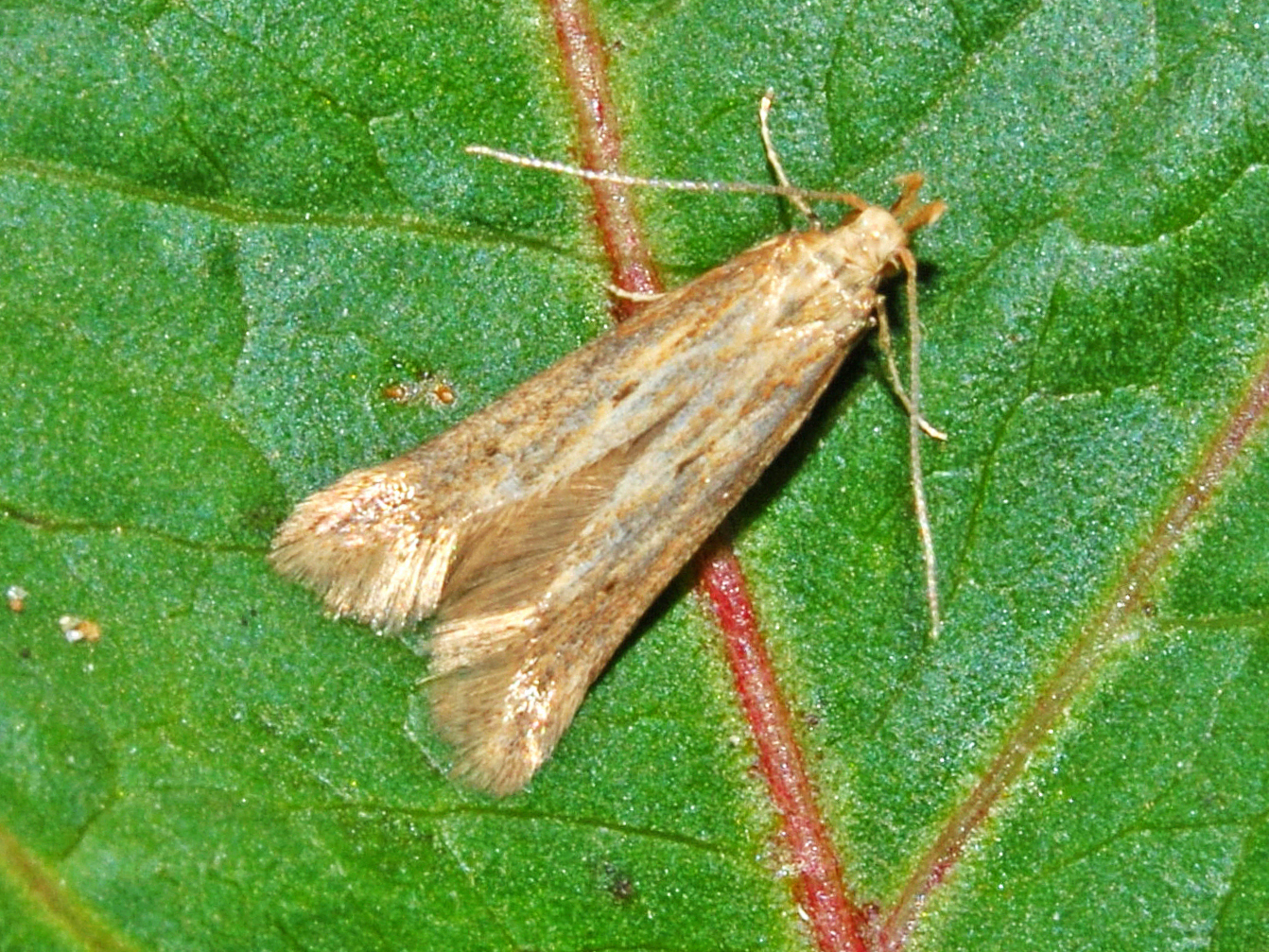

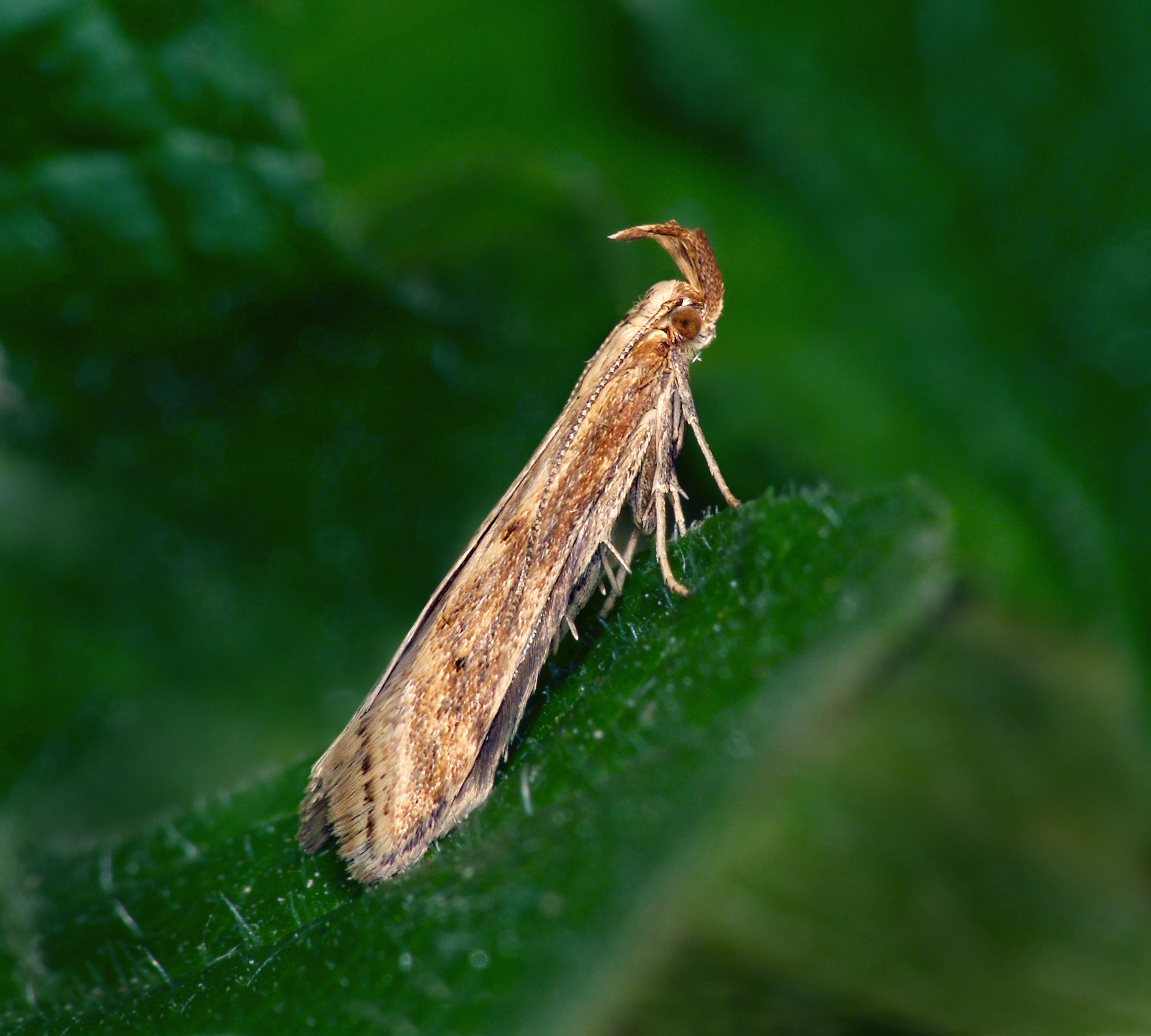
- Side view

Scientific classification
- Kingdom: Animalia
- Phylum: Arthropoda
- Class: Insecta
- Order: Lepidoptera
- Family: Gelechiidae
- Genus: Metzneria
- Species: M. lappella

Binomial name
- Metzneria lappella (Linnaeus, 1758)

Synonyms
- Phalaena (Tinea) lappella Linnaeus, 1758; Gelechia lappella Linnaeus, 1758; Phalaena lappella

= Metzneria lappella =

Species of moth

Metzneria lappella, the burdock seedhead moth or burdock seed moth, is a moth of the family Gelechiidae.

== Distribution ==
This species is present in most of Europe and it is widely distributed throughout the Palaearctic region, northwards to the Arctic Circle. It is an introduced species in North America, where it is found from Maine and Quebec to Florida, west to Ontario and Missouri.

== Habitat ==
These moths mainly inhabit fields, roadsides and waste places.

== Description ==
Metzneria lappella has a wingspan of 13–19 mm.

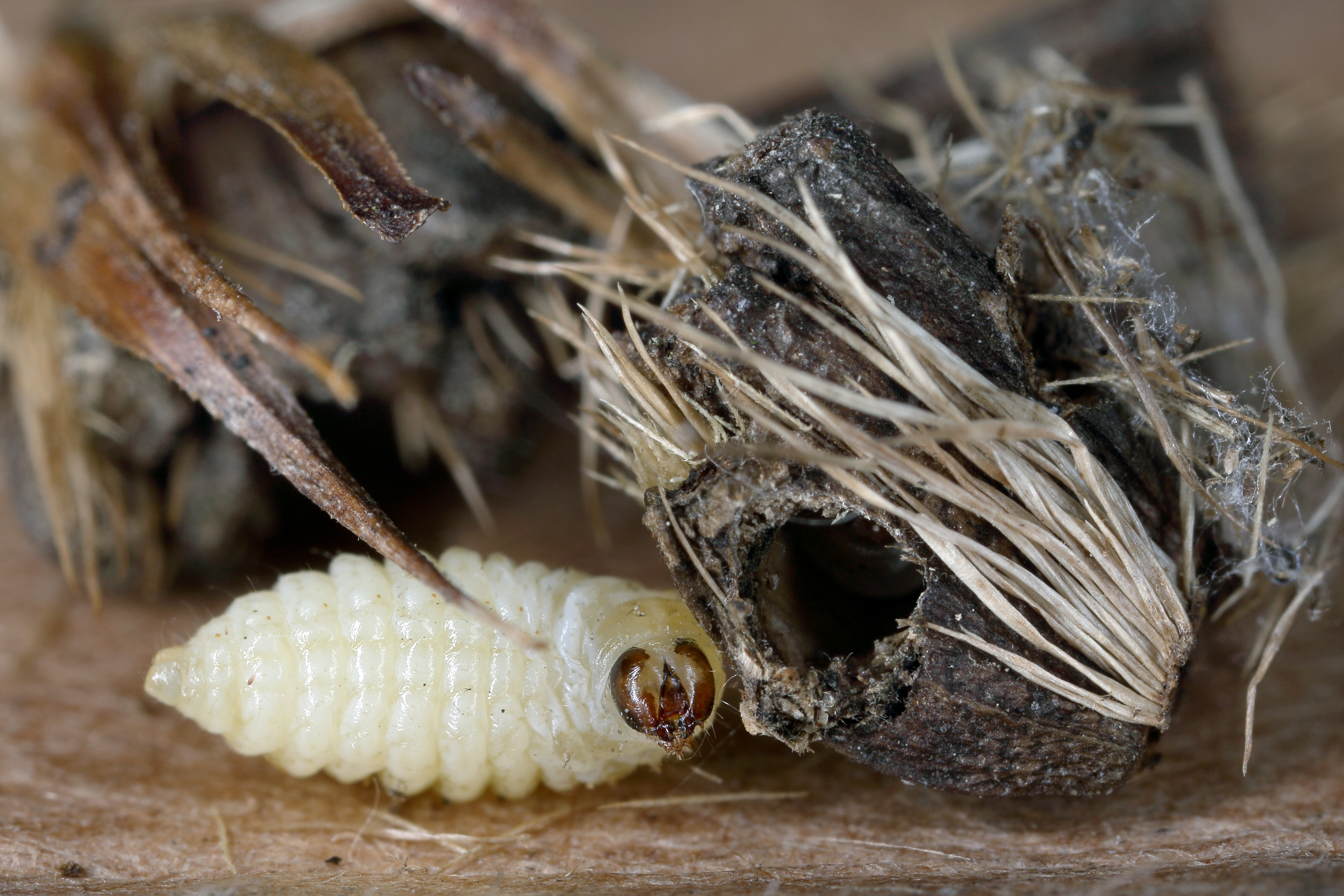
Larva

== Biology ==
Adults are on wing in June and July in the north of North America and from April to August in the south. In England they fly in June and July. There is one generation per year (univoltine species). The larvae feed on the developing seeds of Arctium species, including Arctium lappa and Arctium minus.
