= Metzneria littorella =

Scientific classification
- Domain: Eukaryota
- Kingdom: Animalia
- Phylum: Arthropoda
- Class: Insecta
- Order: Lepidoptera
- Family: Gelechiidae
- Genus: Metzneria
- Species: M. littorella

Binomial name
- Metzneria littorella (Douglas, 1850)

Synonyms
- Gelechia littorella Douglas, 1850; Metzneria quinquepunctella Herrich-Schäffer, 1855

Species of moth

Metzneria littorella, the Isle of Wight neb, is a moth of the family Gelechiidae. It was described by Douglas in 1850. It is found in Great Britain, Spain, France, Italy, on Corsica, Sardinia, Sicily, Cyprus and in Russia.
