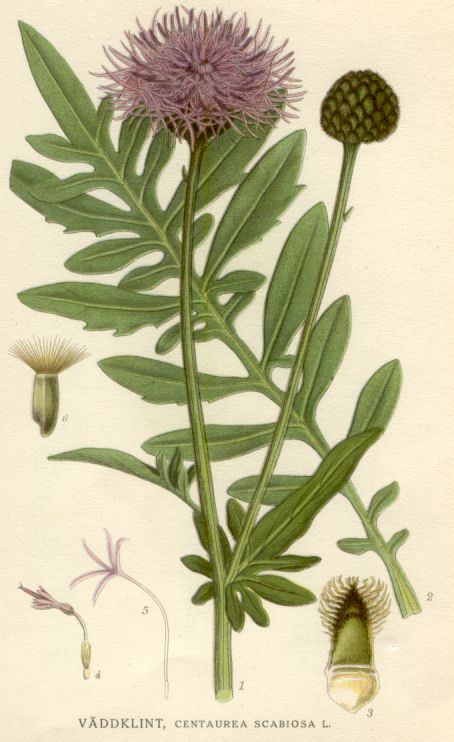

Scientific classification
- Kingdom: Plantae
- Clade: Tracheophytes
- Clade: Angiosperms
- Clade: Eudicots
- Clade: Asterids
- Order: Asterales
- Family: Asteraceae
- Genus: Centaurea
- Species: C. scabiosa

Binomial name
- Centaurea scabiosa L.

= Centaurea scabiosa =

Species of flowering plant in the daisy family

Centaurea scabiosa, or greater knapweed, is a perennial plant of the genus Centaurea. It is native to Europe and bears purple flower heads.

Greater knapweed is found growing in dry grasslands, hedgerows and cliffs on lime-rich soil. Upright branched stems terminate in single thistle-like flowerheads, each having an outer ring of extended, purple-pink "ragged" bracts which form a crown around the central flowers. The plant has deeply dissected leaves which form a clump at the base.

This species is very valuable to bees. It is also a magnet for many species of butterfly. Among them is the marbled white.

This is the only known food plant for caterpillars of the Coleophoridae case-bearer moth Coleophora didymella. Centaurea scabiosa has been used in traditional herbal healing as either a vulnerary or an emollient.

== Description ==
This perennial herb grows with an erect grooved stem up to 90 cm high. The leaves are alternate, pinnatifid and with stalks. The flower heads are 5 cm across and on long stalks. The florets are red-purple.

== Habitat ==
Dry grassland, roadsides and calcareous substrate.

== Distribution ==
Found in Great Britain and Ireland. Native to Europe and Asia. In Europe, it can be found in most regions except Portugal and certain islands, such as Sicily, Corsica, Sardinia, Mallorca, the Greek islands and Iceland. In Asia, it can be found in the Caucasus region and Siberia with the exception of Chukotka and the Magadan Oblast.

== Images ==
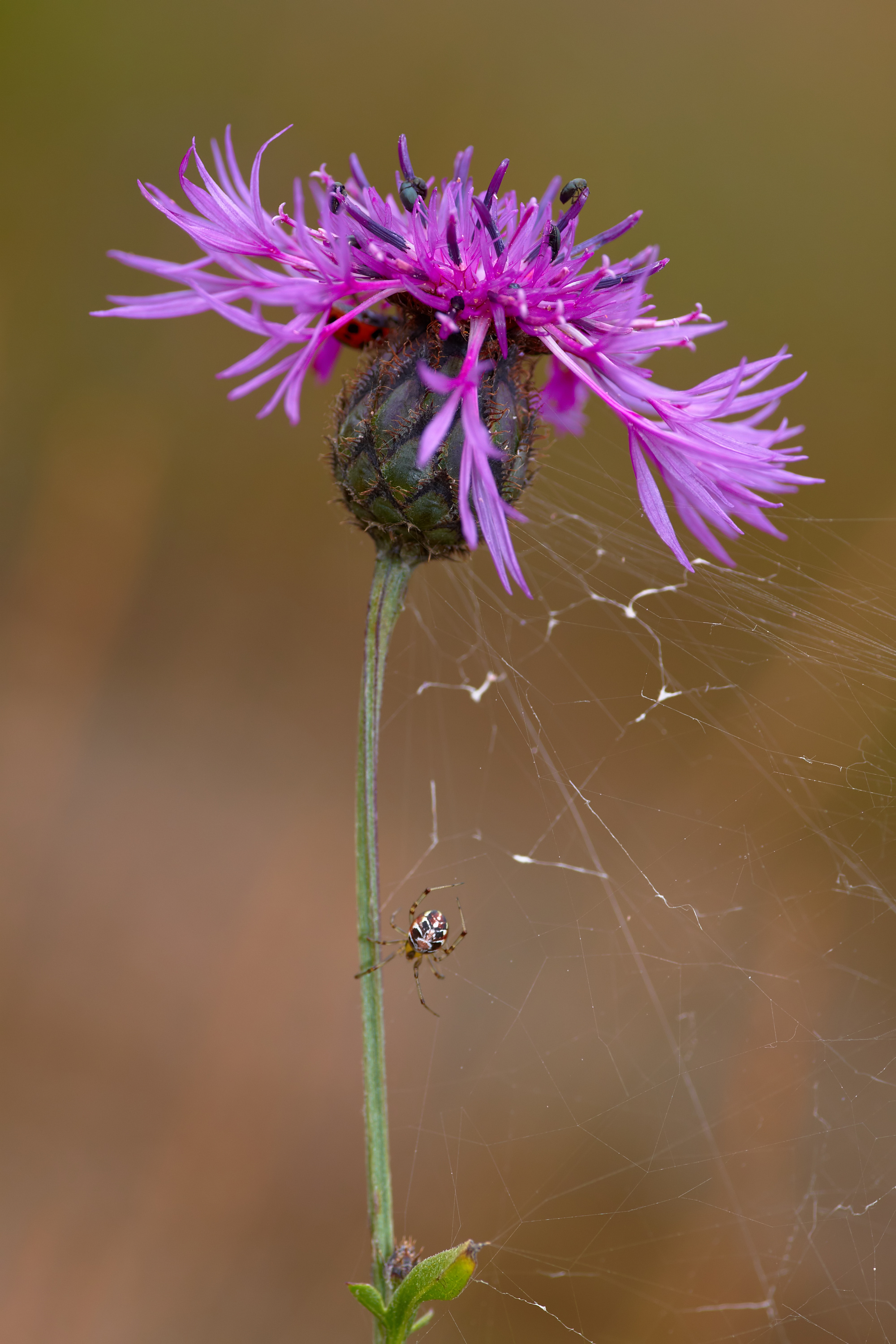

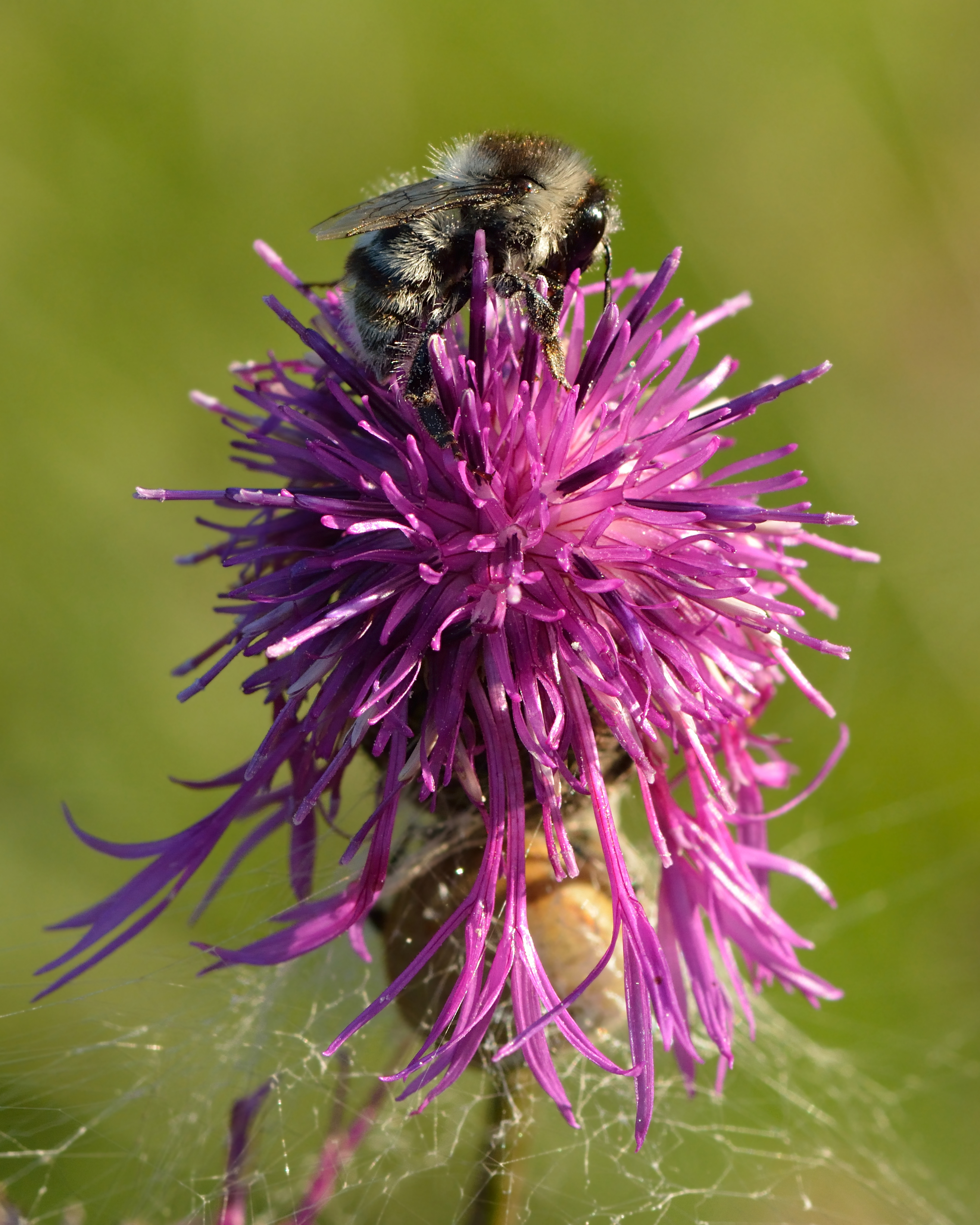

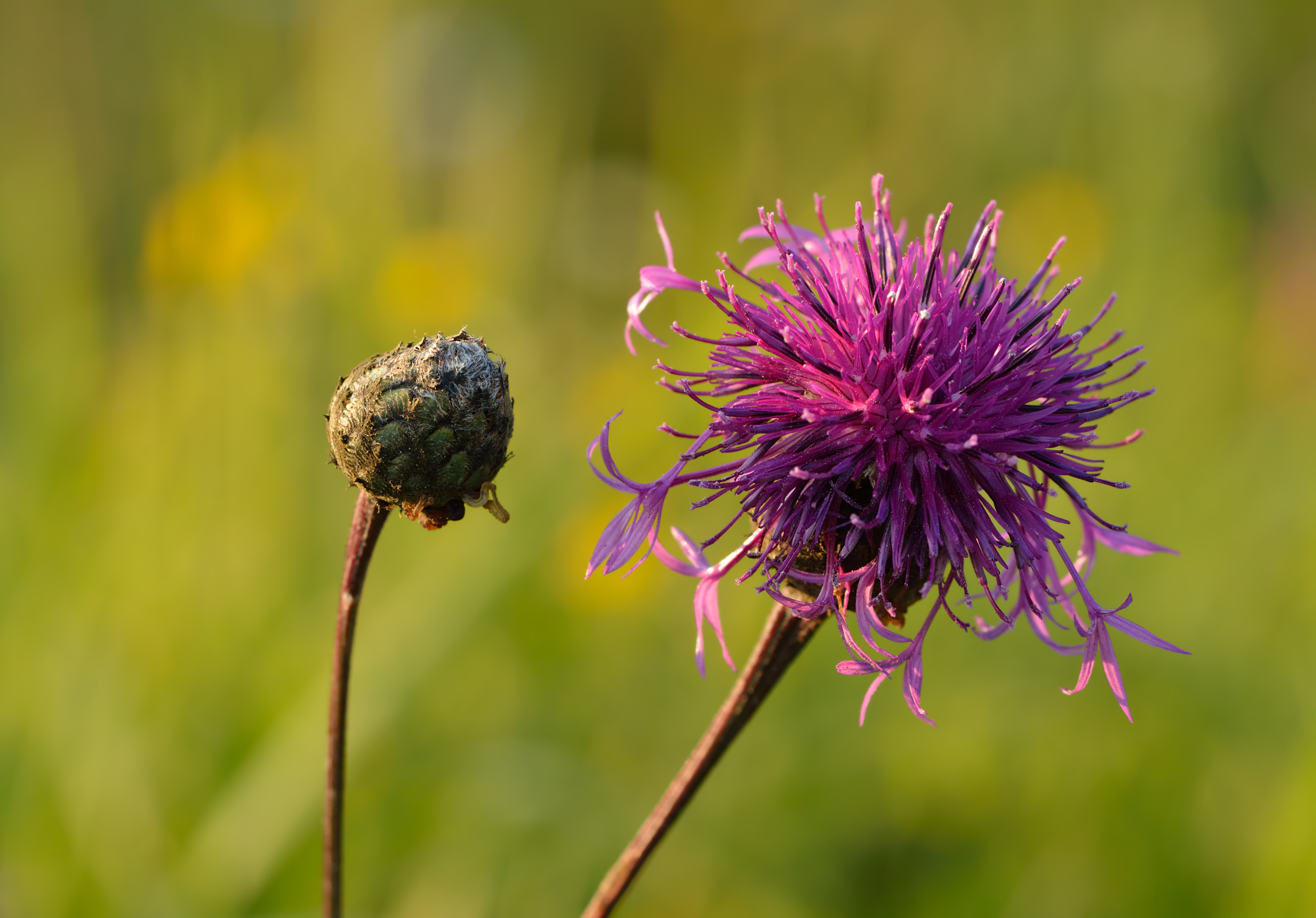

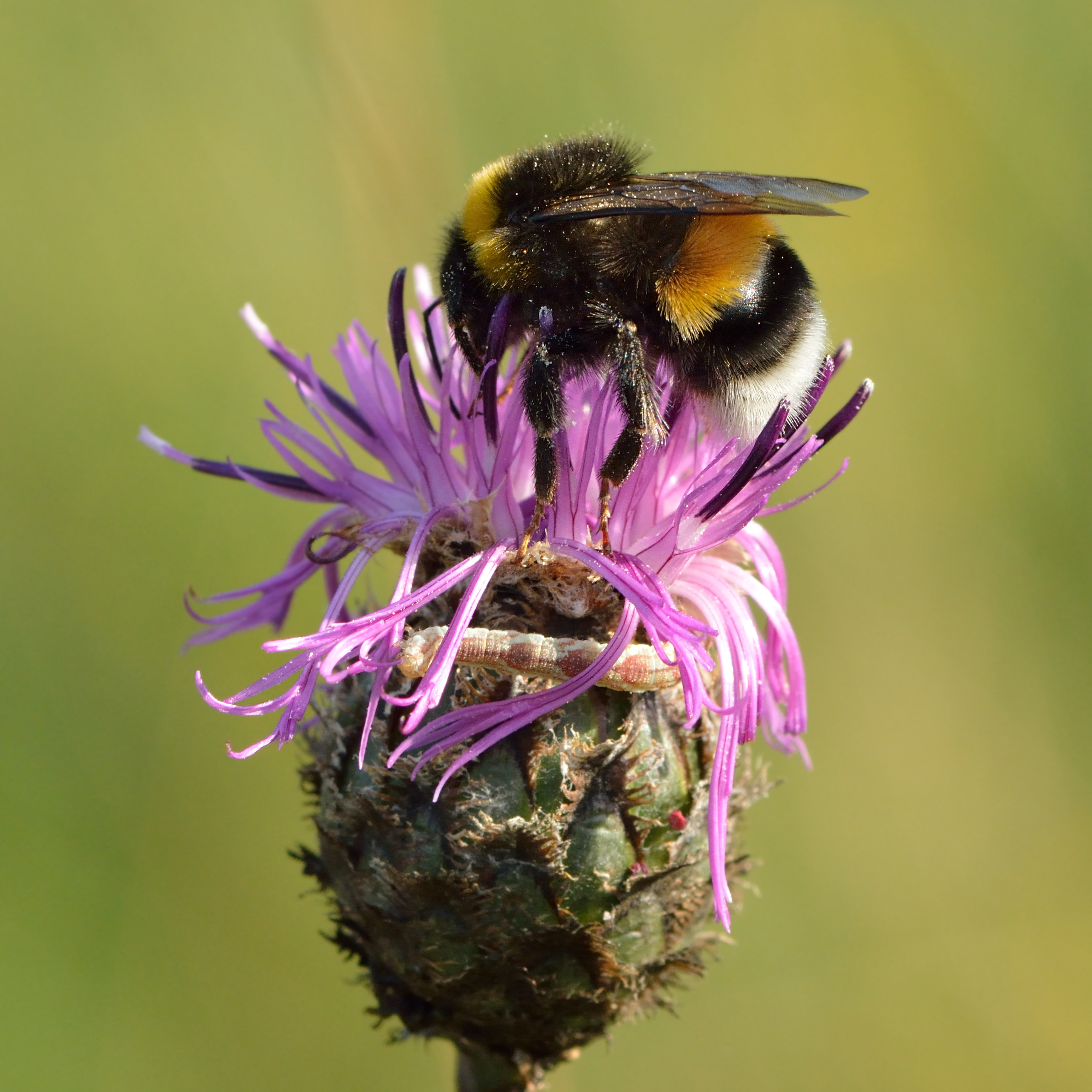

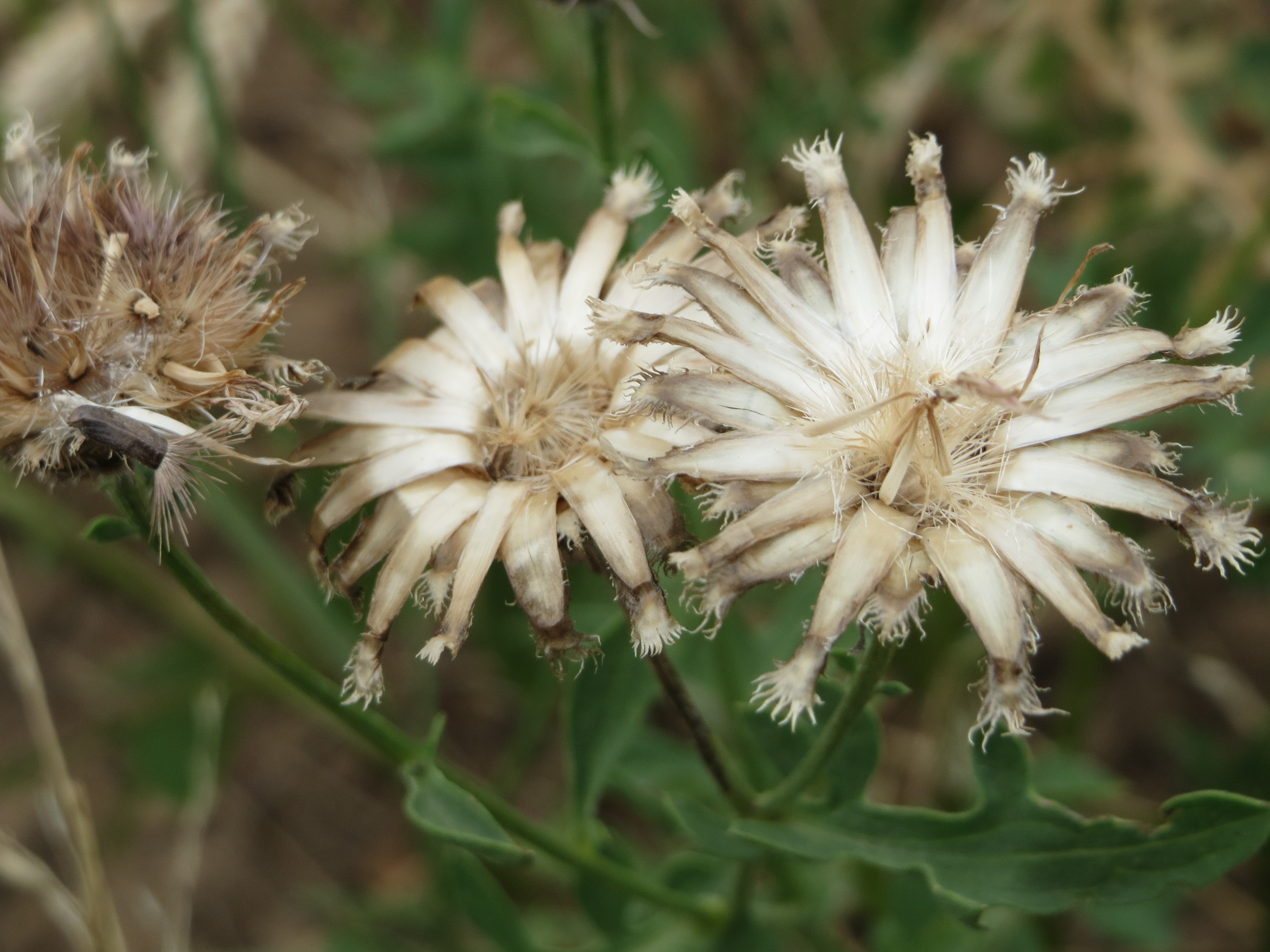
