= Josef Johann Mann =

German Bohemian entomologist

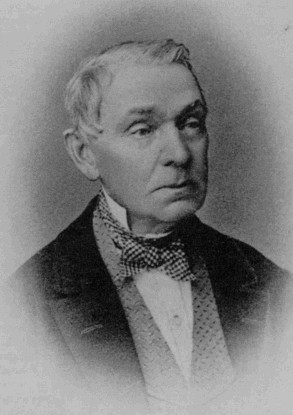
- Josef Johann Mann (before 1889)
- Born: 19 May 1804; Jablonné v Podještědí, Bohemia
- Died: 20 March 1889 (aged 84)
- Occupation: Entomologist

Josef Johann Mann (19 May 1804 – 20 March 1889), or Johann Josef Ritter von Mann, was a German Bohemian entomologist and a specialist in Lepidoptera.

Mann was born in Jablonné v Podještědí, Bohemia (present-day Czech Republic). He was a painter, expedition collector and preparator at the Hofkabinet in Vienna, Austria. Mann worked with the curator Alois Friedrich Rogenhofer. He died in Vienna.

== Bibliography ==
- Mann, J.: 1855, Die Lepidopteren gesammelt auf einer entomologischen Reise in Corsika. Verh. zool. – bot. Ver. Wien, 5: 529 – 572.
- Mann, J.: 1866, Aufzählung der in Jahre 1865 in der Dobrudscha gesammelter Schmetterlinge. Verh. zool. – bot. ges.., 16, 1 – 40.
- Mann, J.: 1866, Josef Emanuel Fischer Edler von Rösslerstamm. Nachruf. Verh. Zool. – Bot.Ges., 16, 51 – 54.
- Mann, J.: 1867, Schmetterlinge gesammelt im Jahre 1866 um Josefstahl in der kroatischen Militärgrenze. Verh. zool. – bot. ges., 17, 63 – 67, Wien.
- Mann, J.: 1872, Verzeichniss der im Jahre 1851 bei Brussa in Kleinasien gesammelten Schmetterlinge. Wien ent. Monatschr., 6: 356 – 371, 373 – 409.
