= Alphus =

Alphus is the scientific name of two genera of organisms and may refer to:

- Alphus (beetle) White, 1855, a genus of beetles in the family Cerambycidae
- Alphus (moth) Wallengren, 1869, a genus of moths in the family Hepialidae
