= Triodia =

Triodia may refer to:

- Triodia (moth), a genus of moths of the family Hepialidae
- Triodia (plant), a genus of grasses in the family Poaceae
