= Triodia nubifer =

Scientific classification
- Kingdom: Animalia
- Phylum: Arthropoda
- Clade: Pancrustacea
- Class: Insecta
- Order: Lepidoptera
- Family: Hepialidae
- Genus: Triodia
- Species: T. nubifer

Binomial name
- Triodia nubifer (Lederer, 1853)

Synonyms
- Epialus nubifer Lederer, 1853; Hepialus nubifer

Species of moth

Triodia nubifer is a species of moth belonging to the family Hepialidae. It was described by Julius Lederer in 1853 and is known from Central Russia and Kazakhstan.
