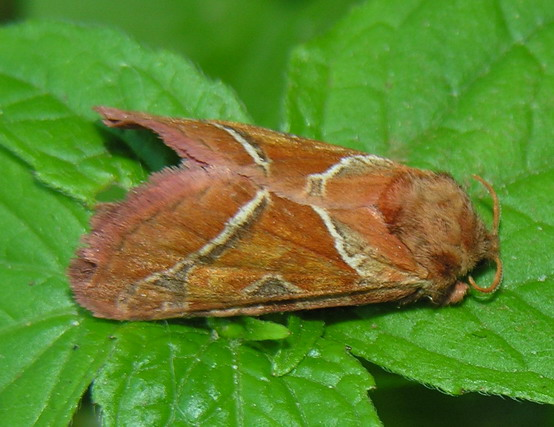
- Triodia sylvina, male

Scientific classification
- Kingdom: Animalia
- Phylum: Arthropoda
- Clade: Pancrustacea
- Class: Insecta
- Order: Lepidoptera
- Family: Hepialidae
- Genus: Triodia
- Species: T. sylvina

Binomial name
- Triodia sylvina (Linnaeus, 1761)

Synonyms
- List: Phalaena (Noctua) sylvina Linnaeus, 1761; Alphus sylvinus (Linnaeus, 1761); Hepialus sylvina (Linnaeus, 1761); Hepialus sylvinus (Linnaeus, 1761); Bombyx hamma [Denis and Schiffermüller], 1775; Hepialus angulatus Fabricius, 1781; Phalaena multicolor Fourcroy, 1785; Hegialus crux Fabricius, 1787; Noctua angulum de Villers, 1789; Noctua c-album de Villers, 1789; Hepialus fauna Schrank, 1801; Hepialus cruxator Haworth, 1802; Hepialus angulator Haworth, 1802; Hepialus sylvinator Haworth, 1802; Hepialus pallidus Hormuzaki, 1894; Hepialus poecilus Hormuzaki, 1894; Hepialus kruegeri Turati, 1909; Hepialus victoriae Petkoff, 1914; Hepialus brunnescens Lempke, 1938; Hepialus pauper Lempke, 1938; Hepialus androgynus Agenjo, 1942; Hepialus pardoi Agenjo, 1942; Hepialus alfaroi Agenjo, 1942; Hepialus laincalvo Agenjo, 1942; Triodia nigrescens Lempke, 1961; Triodia obscura Lempke, 1961; Triodia pallida Lempke, 1961; Triodia reducta Lempke, 1961

= Orange swift =

Species of moth

The orange swift or orange moth (Triodia sylvina) is a moth belonging to the family Hepialidae. The species was first described by Carl Linnaeus in 1761 and was previously placed in the genus Hepialus. It is distributed throughout Europe.

== Description ==
This species has a wingspan of 32–48 mm. The male has rich orange forewings with two white bars forming a "V" shape. The hindwings are dark brown. The female is similar but generally larger and less brightly coloured. It flies at night from June to September and is attracted to light. They do not have a proboscis so will not be found at flowers feeding. The globular, shiny black eggs are broadcast by the female as she hovers over the food plant.

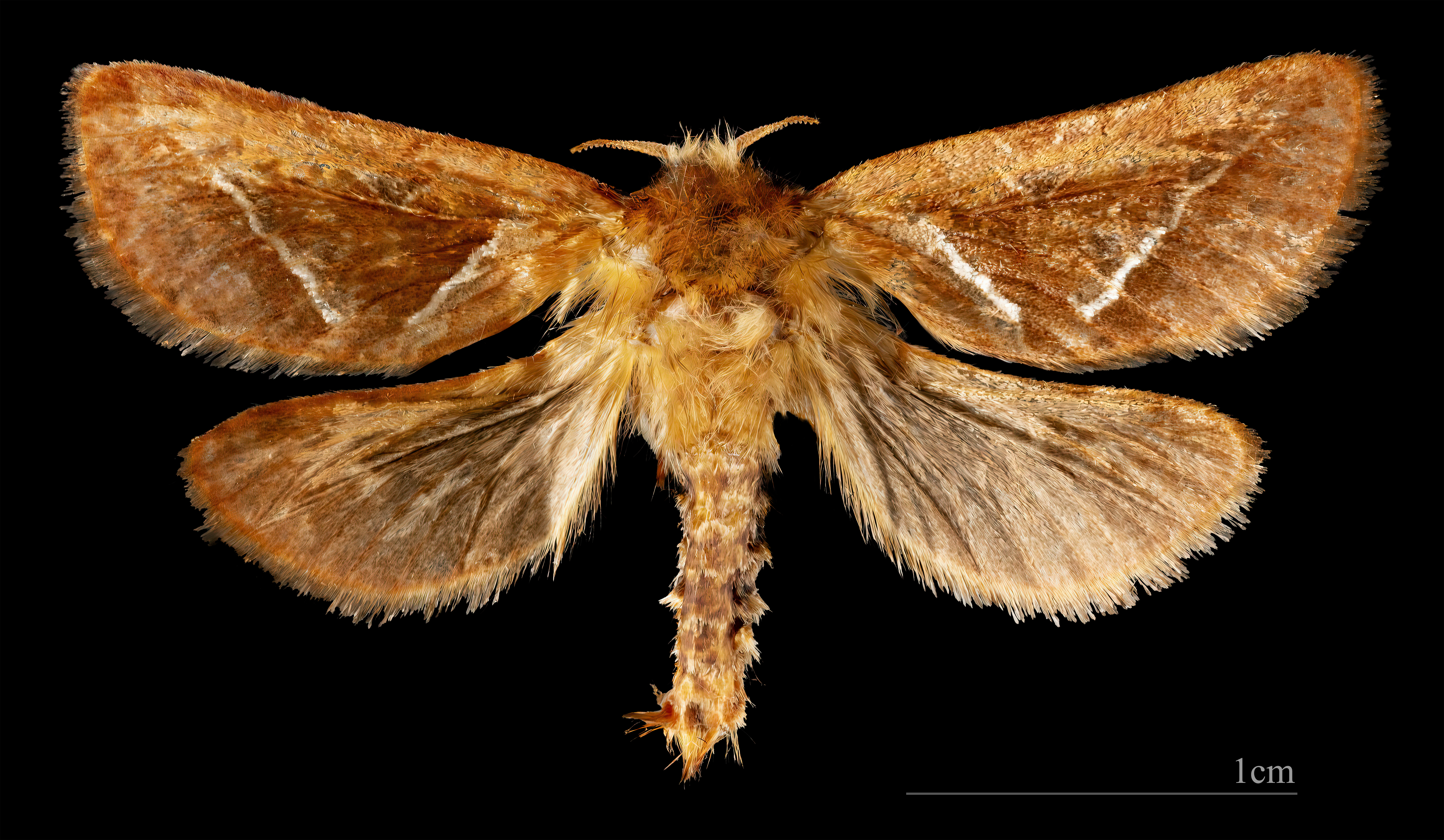
♂

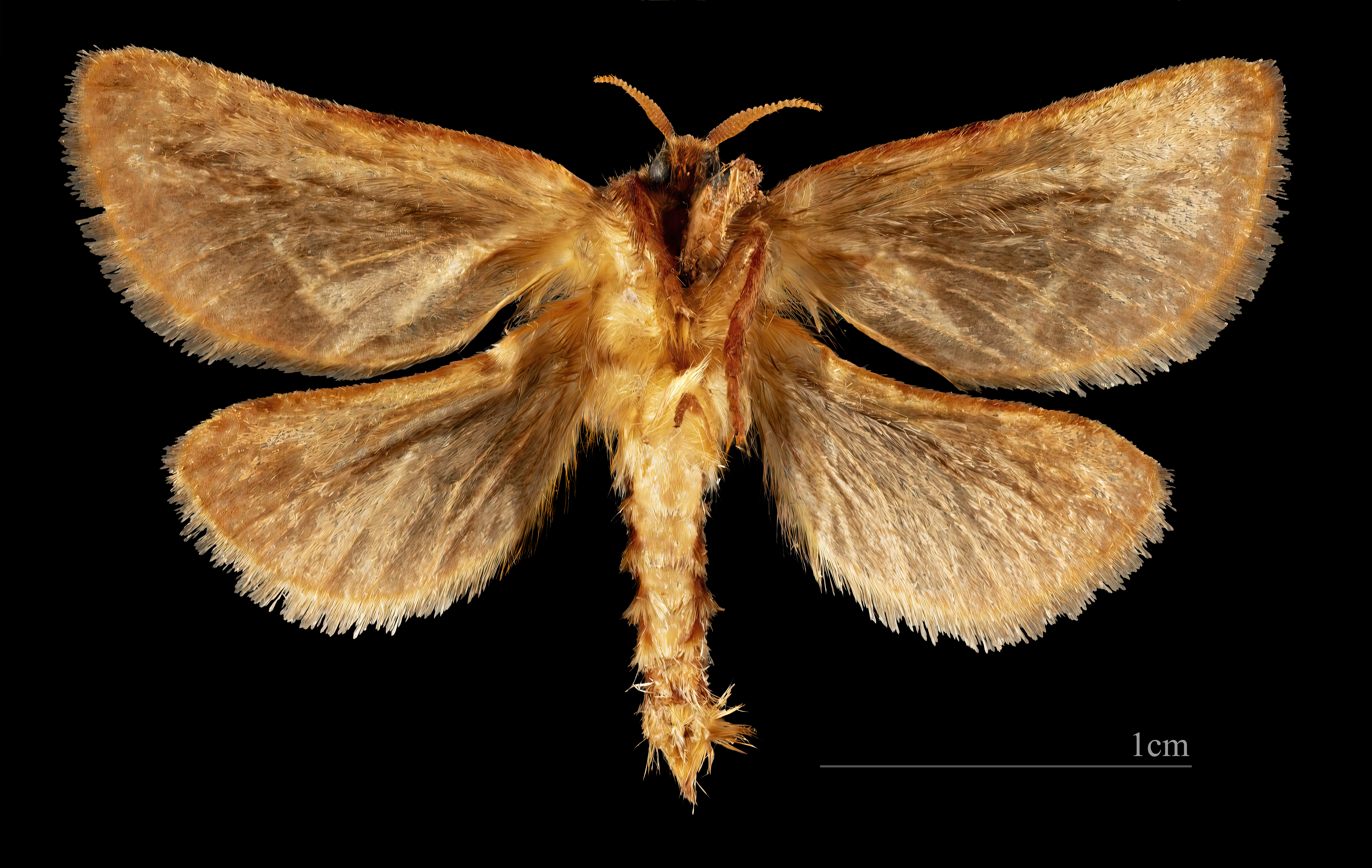
♂ △

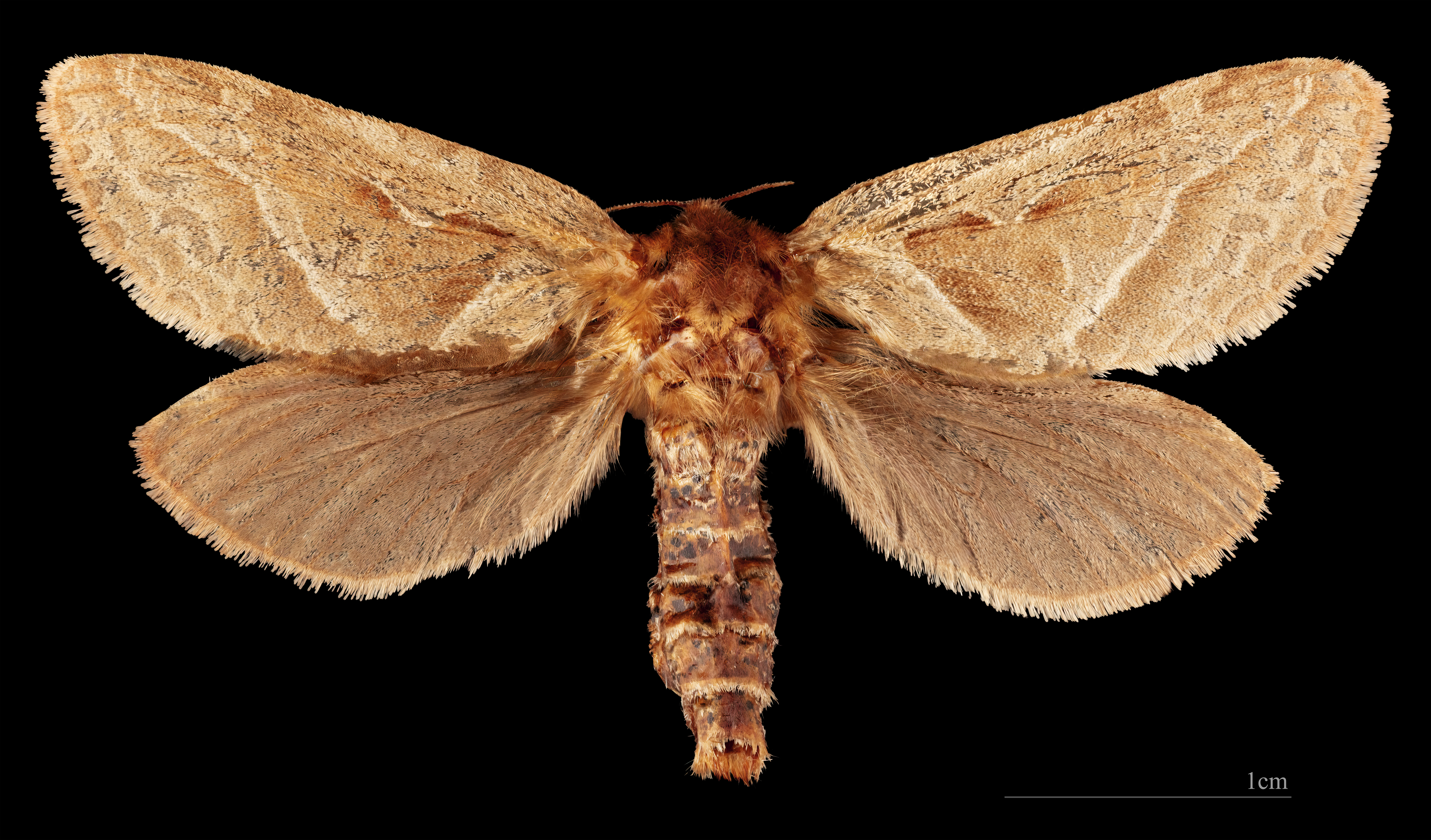
♀

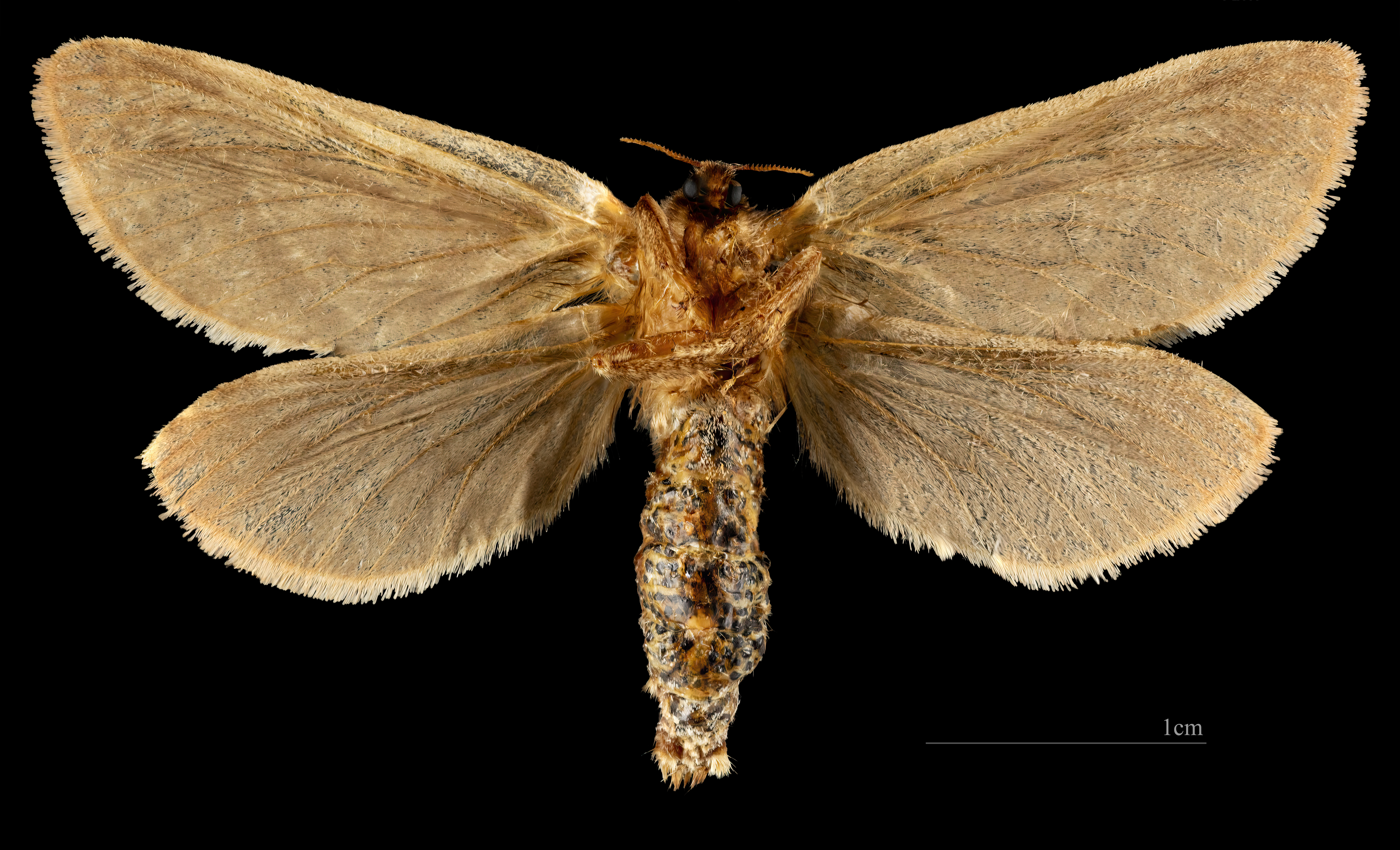
♀ △

Larva

When they hatch the larvae find their foodplant, bore into the root and are 25 to 30 mm long when fully fed. They have an orange-brown head and a shiny white body with brownish-orange dorsal plates on the thoracic segments; spiracles are black. They can feed for two years from September to July on the roots of various plants including bracken (Pteridium species), dandelion (Taraxacum species), docks (Rumex species), hop (Humulus lupulus) and viper's bugloss (Echium vulgare).

Pupa

The larvae pupate in silken cocoons near the surface of the soil; pupa are elongated with hooked bristles on the abdominal segments. They leave the cocoon, prior to the emergence of the imago.

== Distribution ==
Found throughout northern, central and south-eastern Europe to the Middle East.

== Etymology ==
Originally placed in the genus Hepialus – from the Greek; hēpialos – means a fever, as in 'the fitful, alternating flight' of the moth. It has since been allocated to the genus Triodia. The specific name sylvina – from silvanus – belonging to a wood, referring to the moth's habitat; although it can be found in other habitats.

== Gallery ==
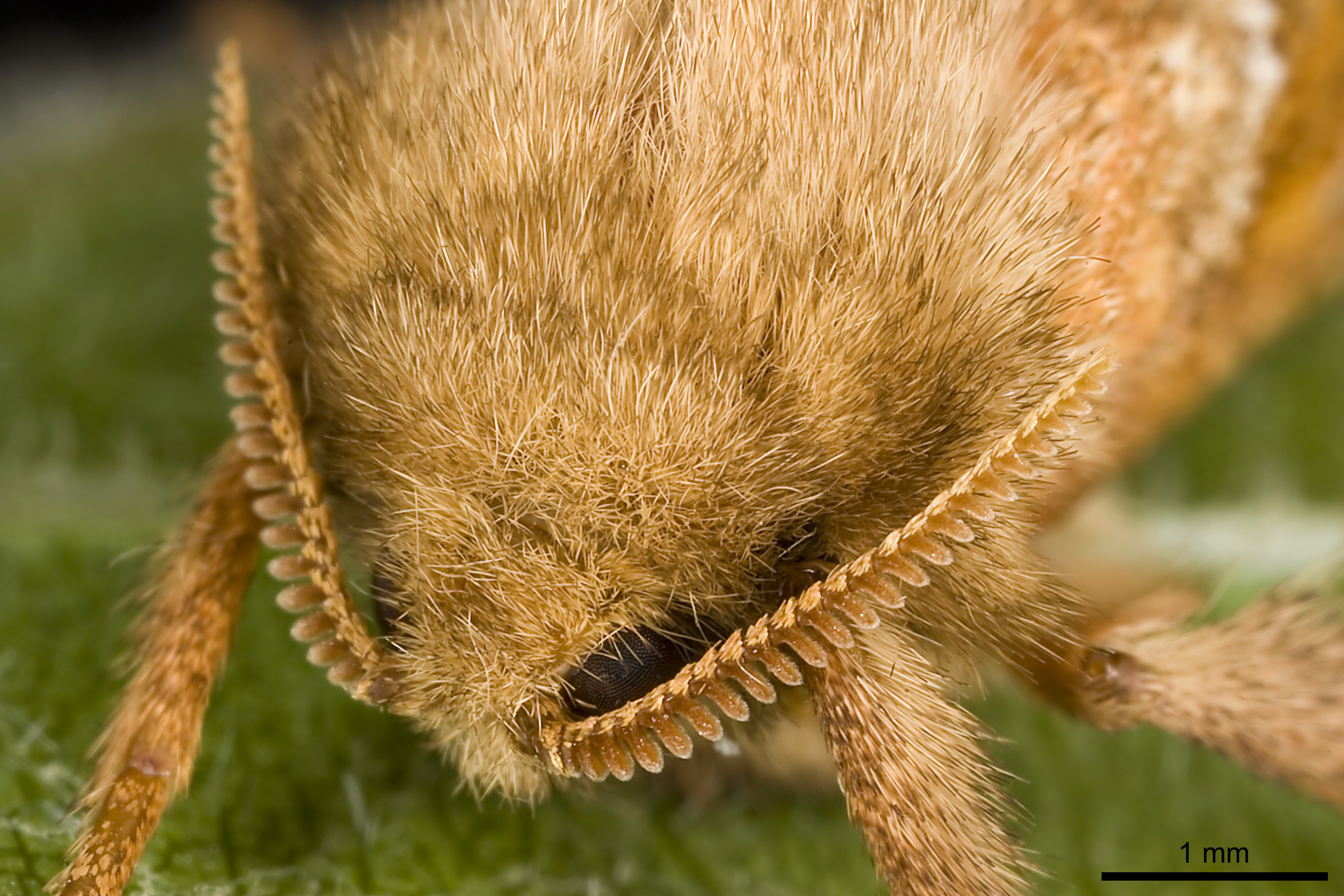

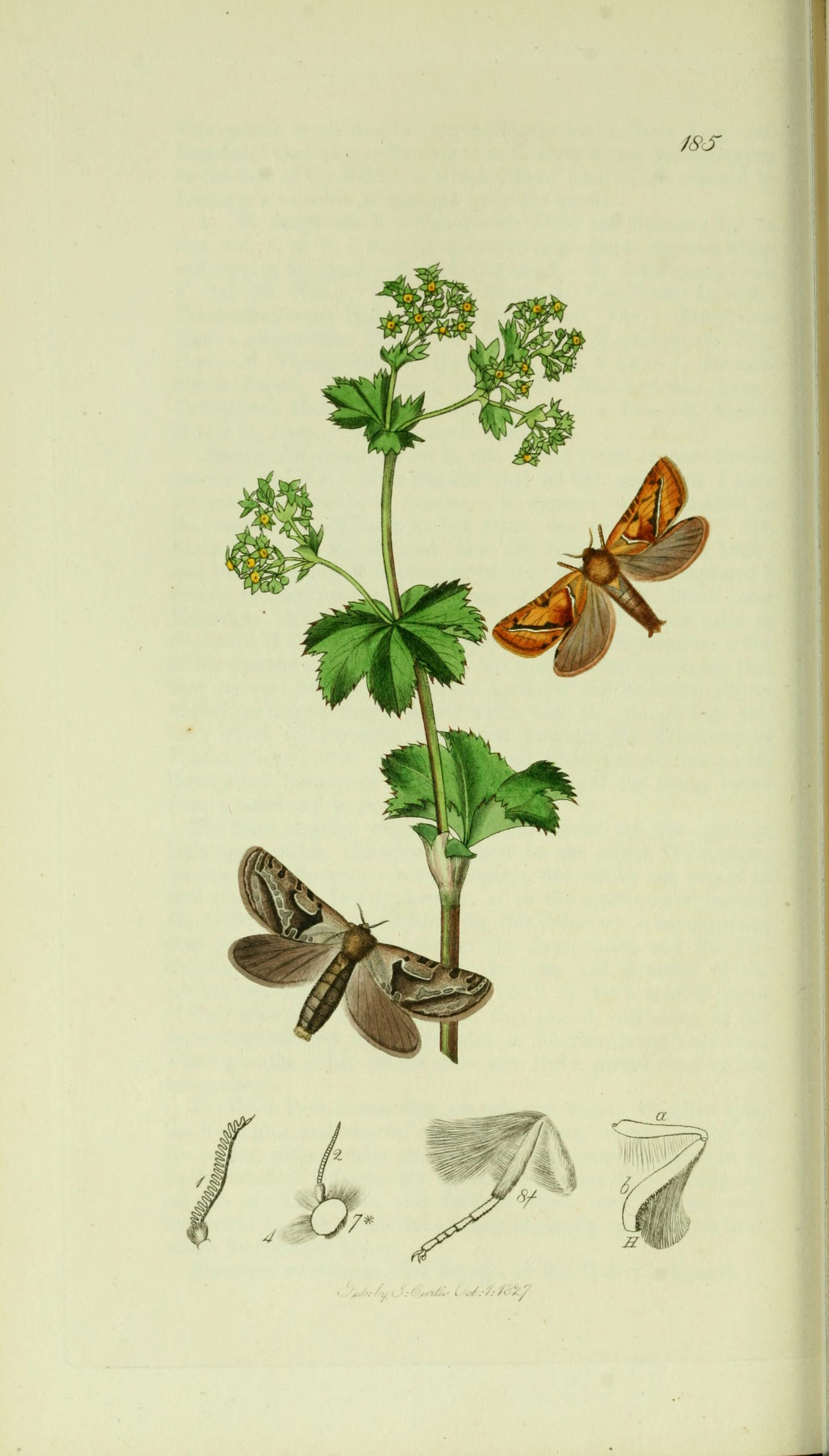
John Curtis's British Entomology Volume 5

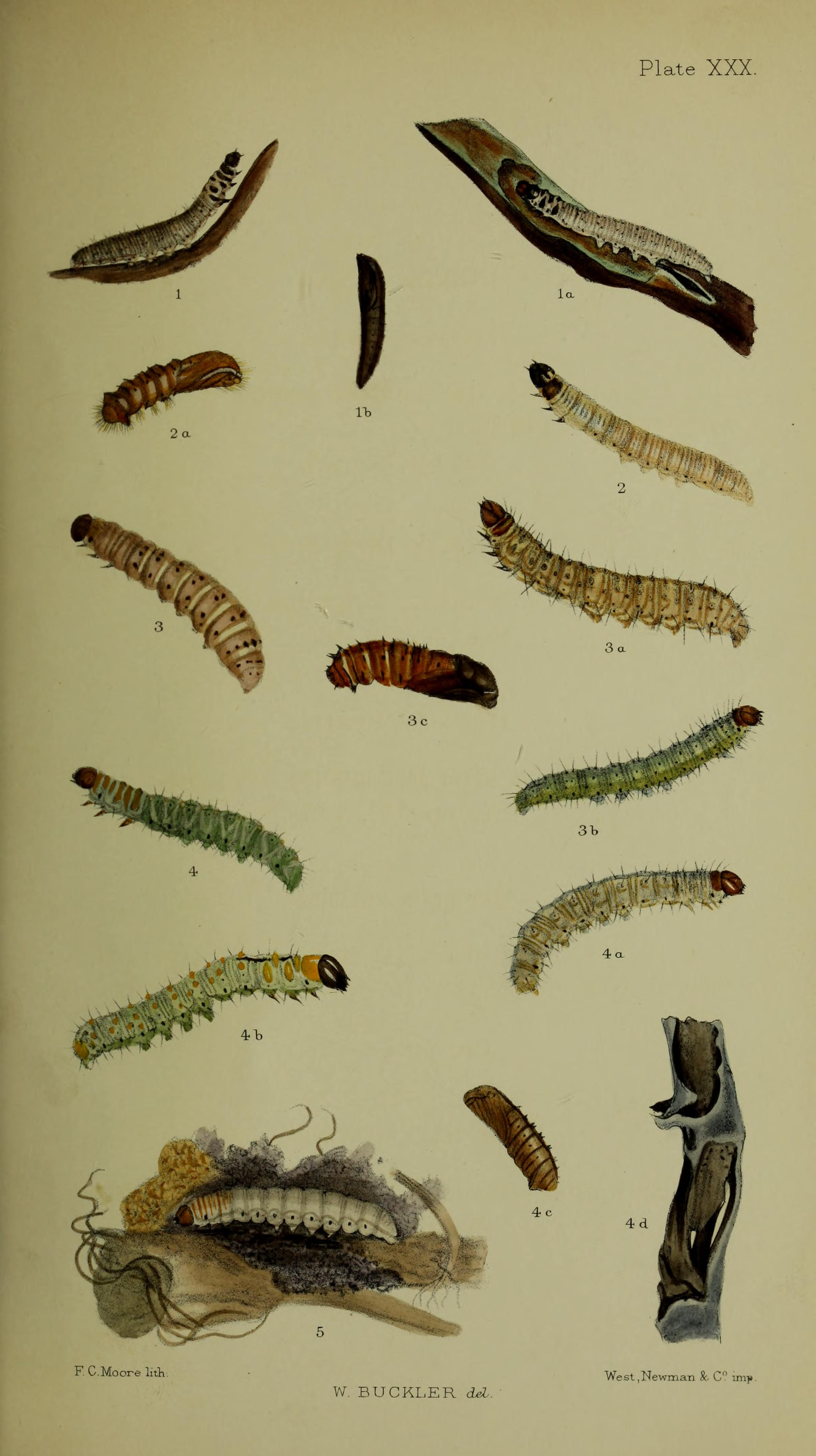
Figs. 5 larvae after last moult burrowing in root of dock

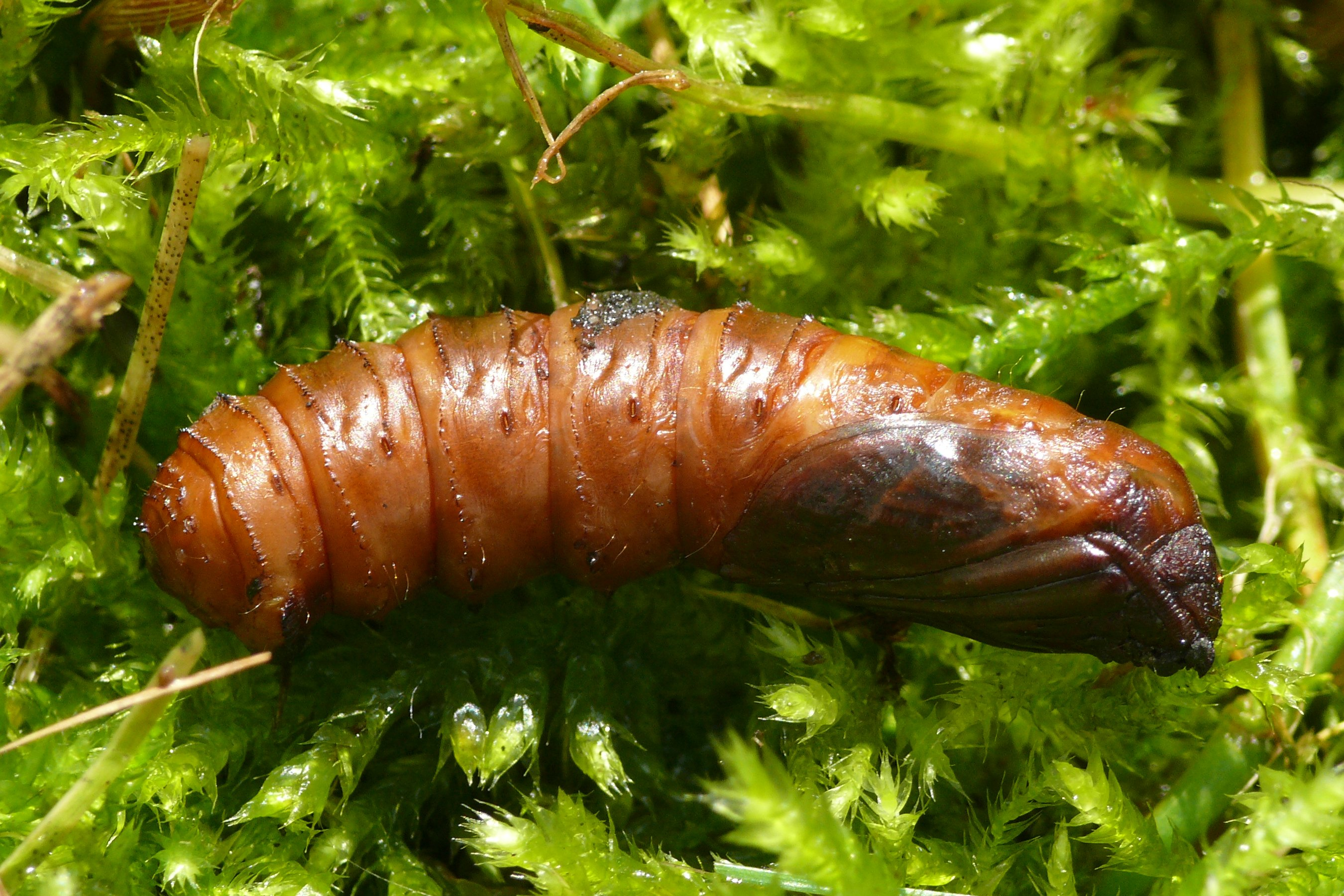
female pupa

== Notes ==
1. The flight season refers to the British Isles. This may vary in other parts of the range.
