= Alphus tuberosus =

Scientific classification
- Kingdom: Animalia
- Phylum: Arthropoda
- Clade: Pancrustacea
- Class: Insecta
- Order: Coleoptera
- Suborder: Polyphaga
- Infraorder: Cucujiformia
- Family: Cerambycidae
- Genus: Alphus
- Species: A. tuberosus

Binomial name
- Alphus tuberosus (Germar, 1824)

Species of beetle

Alphus tuberosus is a species of beetle in the family Cerambycidae. It was described by Ernst Friedrich Germar in 1824. It is found in Peru, Brazil (Goiás, Mato Grosso do Sul, Bahia, Minas Gerais, Espírito Santo, Rio de Janeiro, São Paulo, Paraná, Santa Catarina, Rio Grande do Sul), Bolivia (Santa Cruz), Paraguay, and Argentina (Misiones).
