= Alphus alboguttatus =

Scientific classification
- Kingdom: Animalia
- Phylum: Arthropoda
- Class: Insecta
- Order: Coleoptera
- Suborder: Polyphaga
- Infraorder: Cucujiformia
- Family: Cerambycidae
- Genus: Alphus
- Species: A. alboguttatus

Binomial name
- Alphus alboguttatus (Melzer, 1935)

Synonyms
- Acanthoderes alboguttata Melzer, 1935; Psapharochrus alboguttatus (Melzer, 1935)

Species of beetle

Alphus alboguttatus is a species of beetle in the family Cerambycidae. It was described by Melzer in 1935.
