= Triodia froitzheimi =

Scientific classification
- Domain: Eukaryota
- Kingdom: Animalia
- Phylum: Arthropoda
- Class: Insecta
- Order: Lepidoptera
- Family: Hepialidae
- Genus: Triodia
- Species: T. froitzheimi

Binomial name
- Triodia froitzheimi (Daniel, 1967)

Synonyms
- Hepialus froitzheimi Daniel, 1967

Species of moth

Triodia froitzheimi is a species of moth belonging to the family Hepialidae. It was described by Franz Daniel in 1967 and is known from Jordan.
