= Triodia mlokossevitschi =

Scientific classification
- Domain: Eukaryota
- Kingdom: Animalia
- Phylum: Arthropoda
- Class: Insecta
- Order: Lepidoptera
- Family: Hepialidae
- Genus: Triodia
- Species: T. mlokossevitschi

Binomial name
- Triodia mlokossevitschi (Romanoff, 1884)

Synonyms
- Hepialus mlokossevitschi Romanoff, 1884; Hepialus mlocossewitschi Pfitzner, 1912

Species of moth

Triodia mlokossevitschi is a species of moth belonging to the family Hepialidae. It was described by Romanoff in 1884, and is known from Armenia.
