= Alphus capixaba =

Scientific classification
- Domain: Eukaryota
- Kingdom: Animalia
- Phylum: Arthropoda
- Class: Insecta
- Order: Coleoptera
- Suborder: Polyphaga
- Infraorder: Cucujiformia
- Family: Cerambycidae
- Genus: Alphus
- Species: A. capixaba

Binomial name
- Alphus capixaba Marinoni & Martins, 1978

Species of beetle

Alphus capixaba is a species of beetle in the family Cerambycidae. It was described by Marinoni and Martins in 1978.
