= Triodia laetus =

Scientific classification
- Domain: Eukaryota
- Kingdom: Animalia
- Phylum: Arthropoda
- Class: Insecta
- Order: Lepidoptera
- Family: Hepialidae
- Genus: Triodia
- Species: T. laetus

Binomial name
- Triodia laetus (Staudinger, 1877)

Synonyms
- Hepialus laetus Staudinger, 1877; Hepialus pulchellus Heyne, 1899; Hepialus lactus de Freina and Witt, 1990; Hepialus aetus

Species of moth

Triodia laetus is a species of moth belonging to the family Hepialidae. It was described by Staudinger in 1877, and is known from Central Russia and Armenia.
