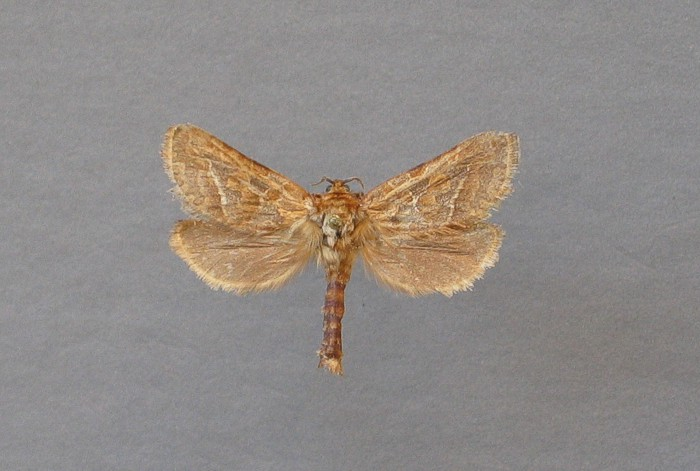

Scientific classification
- Domain: Eukaryota
- Kingdom: Animalia
- Phylum: Arthropoda
- Class: Insecta
- Order: Lepidoptera
- Family: Hepialidae
- Genus: Triodia
- Species: T. amasinus

Binomial name
- Triodia amasinus (Herrich-Schäffer, 1851)

Synonyms
- Hepialus amasinus Herrich-Schäffer, 1851; Triodia amasina; Hepialus dobrogensis Caradja, 1932; Hepialus pinkeri Daniel, 1967

= Triodia amasinus =

Species of moth

Triodia amasinus is a species of moth belonging to the family Hepialidae. It was described by Gottlieb August Wilhelm Herrich-Schäffer in 1851, and it is known from Turkey, Hungary, Romania, Bulgaria, the Republic of Macedonia, Albania and Greece.

The wingspan is about 23 mm.
