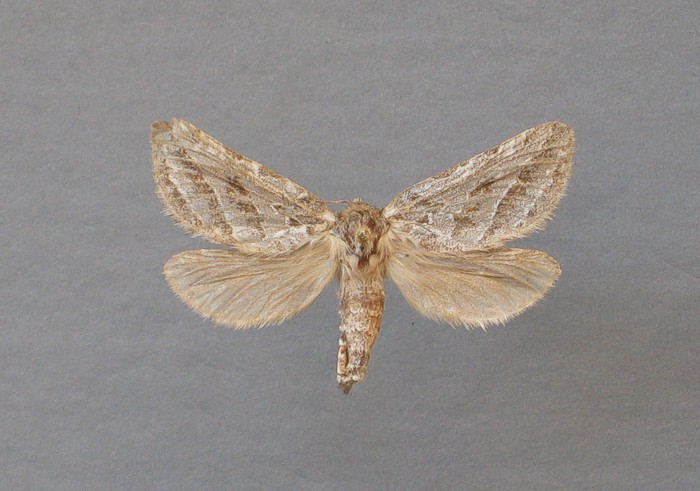

Scientific classification
- Domain: Eukaryota
- Kingdom: Animalia
- Phylum: Arthropoda
- Class: Insecta
- Order: Lepidoptera
- Family: Hepialidae
- Genus: Triodia
- Species: T. adriaticus

Binomial name
- Triodia adriaticus (Osthelder, 1931)

Synonyms
- Hepialus adriaticus Osthelder, 1931; Triodia adriatica

= Triodia adriaticus =

Species of moth

Triodia adriaticus is a species of moth belonging to the family Hepialidae. It was described by Osthelder in 1931, and is known from Slovenia, Croatia, North Macedonia and Greece.
