= Alphus (beetle) =

Scientific classification
- Domain: Eukaryota
- Kingdom: Animalia
- Phylum: Arthropoda
- Class: Insecta
- Order: Coleoptera
- Suborder: Polyphaga
- Infraorder: Cucujiformia
- Family: Cerambycidae
- Tribe: Acanthoderini
- Genus: Alphus; White, 1855

Genus of beetles

Alphus is a genus of beetles in the family Cerambycidae, containing the following species:

- Alphus alboguttatus (Melzer, 1935)
- Alphus capixaba Marinoni & Martins, 1978
- Alphus marinonii Souza & Monne, 2013
- Alphus similis Martins, 1985
- Alphus tuberosus (Germar, 1824)
