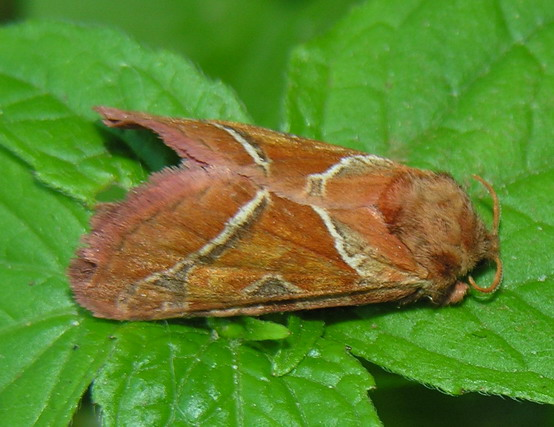
- Triodia sylvina

Scientific classification
- Domain: Eukaryota
- Kingdom: Animalia
- Phylum: Arthropoda
- Class: Insecta
- Order: Lepidoptera
- Family: Hepialidae
- Genus: Triodia; Hübner, 1820

Species
- See text

Synonyms
- Alphus Wallengren, 1869 (nec Dejean, 1833)

= Triodia (moth) =

Genus of moths

Triodia is a genus of moths of the family Hepialidae. There are seven described species found in northern and western Eurasia.

== Species ==
- Triodia adriaticus – Balkans
- Triodia amasinus – Balkans, Turkey
- Triodia froitzheimi – Jordan
- Triodia laetus – Central Russia, Armenia
- Triodia mlokossevitschi – Armenia
- Triodia nubifer – Central Russia, Kazakhstan
- Triodia sylvina (orange swift) – Western Eurasia
