= Micropterix carthaginiensis =

Scientific classification
- Kingdom: Animalia
- Phylum: Arthropoda
- Class: Insecta
- Order: Lepidoptera
- Family: Micropterigidae
- Genus: Micropterix
- Species: M. carthaginiensis

Binomial name
- Micropterix carthaginiensis Heath, 1986

Moth species in family Micropterigidae

Micropterix carthaginiensis is a species of moth belonging to the family Micropterigidae, native to Tunisia. It was described by John Heath in 1986. It is found in the marshland on the southern shore of Lake Ichkeul and at Jebel Boukornine, its type locality.
