= Micropterix lakoniensis =

Scientific classification
- Kingdom: Animalia
- Phylum: Arthropoda
- Class: Insecta
- Order: Lepidoptera
- Family: Micropterigidae
- Genus: Micropterix
- Species: M. lakoniensis

Binomial name
- Micropterix lakoniensis Heath, 1985

Species of moth

Micropterix lakoniensis is a species of moth belonging to the family Micropterigidae and is an endemic species from Greece. The first specimens were collected from Monemvasia, Greece by G Christensen, M Horak and B Skule, and described by John Heath in 1985. The holotype male is held in the UZM Copenhagen.
