= Micropterix avarcella =

Scientific classification
- Kingdom: Animalia
- Phylum: Arthropoda
- Clade: Pancrustacea
- Class: Insecta
- Order: Lepidoptera
- Family: Micropterigidae
- Genus: Micropterix
- Species: M. avarcella

Binomial name
- Micropterix avarcella (Zagulajev, 1994)

Synonyms
- Microptericina avarcella Zagulajev, 1994

Species of moth

Micropterix avarcella is a species of moth belonging to the family Micropterigidae which was described by Aleksei Konstantinovich Zagulajev in 1994. It is endemic to Russia.
