= Micropterix fenestrellensis =

Scientific classification
- Kingdom: Animalia
- Phylum: Arthropoda
- Clade: Pancrustacea
- Class: Insecta
- Order: Lepidoptera
- Family: Micropterigidae
- Genus: Micropterix
- Species: M. fenestrellensis

Binomial name
- Micropterix fenestrellensis Heath & Kaltenbach, 1984

Species of moth

Micropterix fenestrellensis is a species of moth belonging to the family Micropterigidae. It was described by John Heath and T. Kaltenbach in 1984. It is known from Italy.

The length of the forewings is 3.3 millimetres (0.13 in) for males and 3–3.2 millimetres (0.12–0.13 in) for females.
