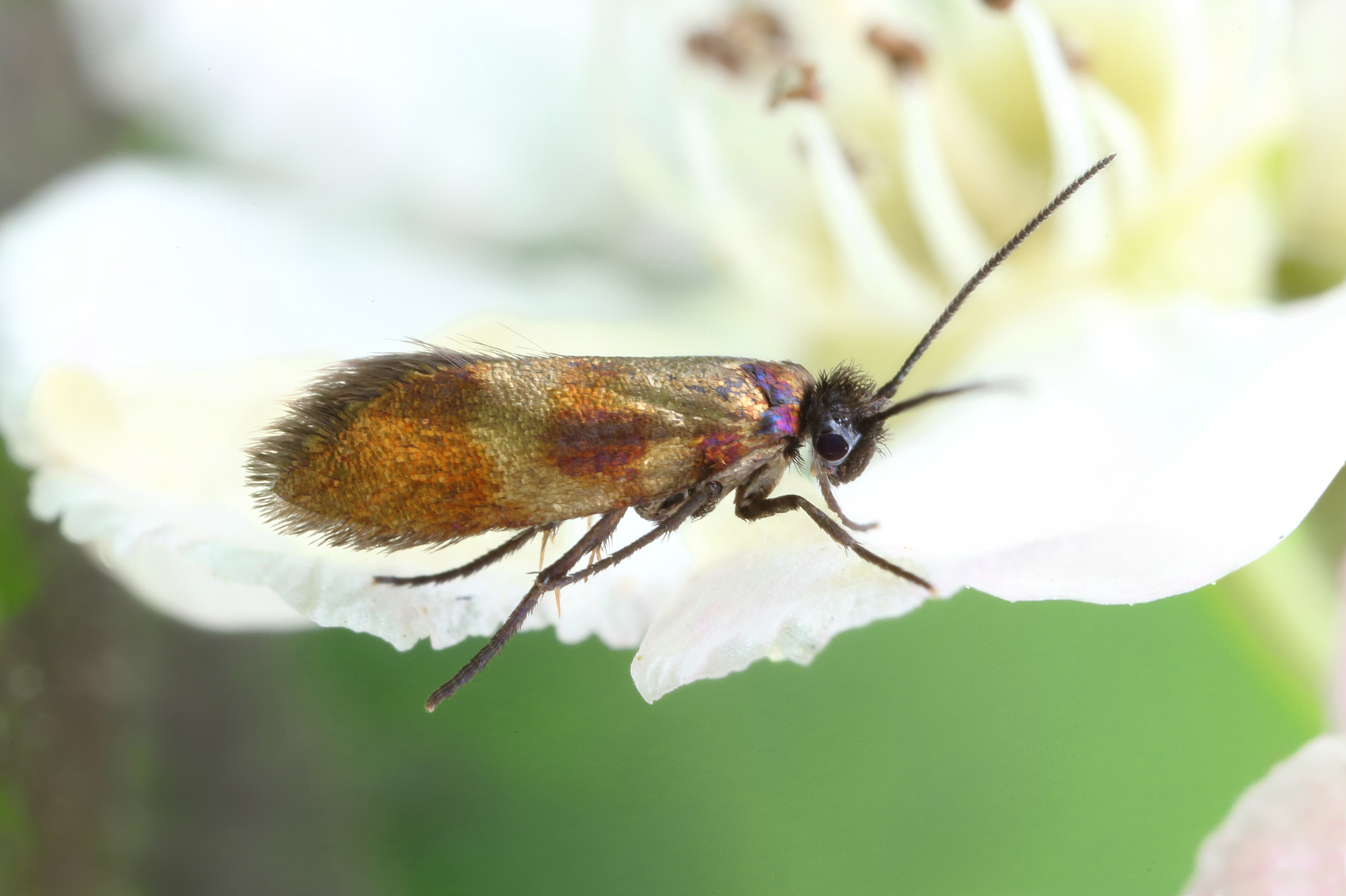

Scientific classification
- Kingdom: Animalia
- Phylum: Arthropoda
- Clade: Pancrustacea
- Class: Insecta
- Order: Lepidoptera
- Family: Micropterigidae
- Genus: Micropterix
- Species: M. mansuetella

Binomial name
- Micropterix mansuetella Zeller, 1844

= Micropterix mansuetella =

Species of moth

Micropterix mansuetella is a species of moth belonging to the family Micropterigidae and can be found in Europe, in very wet woodlands, fens and carrs. The imago was described by Philipp Christoph Zeller in 1844, but the larva and pupa are poorly described.

== Description ==
This is a small moth with a forewing length of 3.4–3.9 millimetres (0.13–0.15 in) for males and 3.8–4.2 millimetres (0.15–0.17 in) for females. It is largely bronzy-gold in colour with some reddish and purple markings. The forewings have a costal spot near the wingbase, a fascia before middle not reaching the dorsum, and the posterior half of wing is deeper golden, often more or less purple-tinged. The hindwings are rather dark bronzy-grey, posteriorly purplish-tinged. Its most distinctive feature is the dark coloured tuft of hair on its head: in most other Micropterix species of the region this tuft is much paler. Like other members of the family, this species has functional jaws and it feeds as an adult on pollen grains, mainly from the flowers of sedges (Carex species). It is single brooded, flying in April, May and June, during the day and has been known to come to light. This species is found primarily in freshwater wetlands.

The larvae feed on leaf-litter and the pupa are unknown.

Similar species

M. mansuetella looks similar to M. tunbergella, but is less distinctly marked and has a black head, which distinguishes it from the other Micropterix.

== Taxonomy ==
The moth was first described from a specimen found in Germany, by the German entomolgist, Philipp Christoph Zeller in 1844. Micropterix was raised by Jacob Hübner and the name comes from the small size of the adult; Mikros – ″little″ and pterux – ″a wing″. The specific part of the name mansuetella, is a Latinized form of Greek, meaning tame; from the docile behaviour of the female when feeding on pollen.

== Distribution ==
Micropterix mansuetella is distributed throughout northern, eastern, central and western Europe (including Great Britain and Ireland). There are gaps in the distribution, including, Belgium, Czech Republic, Portugal and Spain.

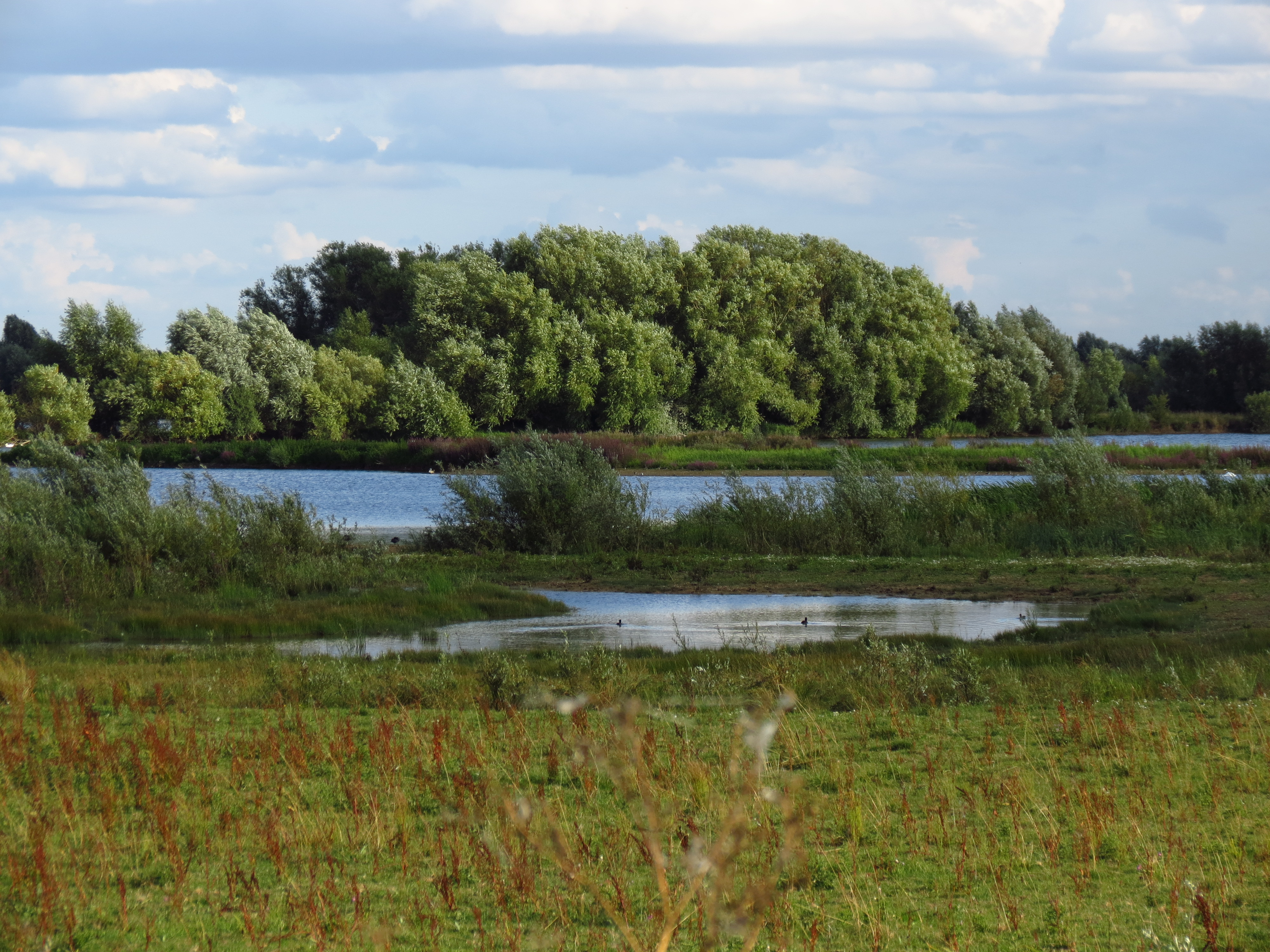
Habitat, Fen Drayton, England
