= Micropterix aureofasciella =

Scientific classification
- Kingdom: Animalia
- Phylum: Arthropoda
- Clade: Pancrustacea
- Class: Insecta
- Order: Lepidoptera
- Family: Micropterigidae
- Genus: Micropterix
- Species: M. aureofasciella

Binomial name
- Micropterix aureofasciella Heath, 1986

Species of moth

Micropterix aureofasciella is a species of moth belonging to the family Micropterigidae which was described by Heath in 1986. It is only known from Algeria, where it occurs along the coastal belt from Algiers to Skikda (formerly known as Philippeville).
