= Micropterix amsella =

Scientific classification
- Kingdom: Animalia
- Phylum: Arthropoda
- Clade: Pancrustacea
- Class: Insecta
- Order: Lepidoptera
- Family: Micropterigidae
- Genus: Micropterix
- Species: M. amsella

Binomial name
- Micropterix amsella Heath, 1975

Species of moth

Micropterix amsella is a species of moth belonging to the family Micropterigidae, first described by John Heath in 1975 and is endemic to Croatia.

The wingspan is 6–8 millimetres (0.24–0.31 in).
