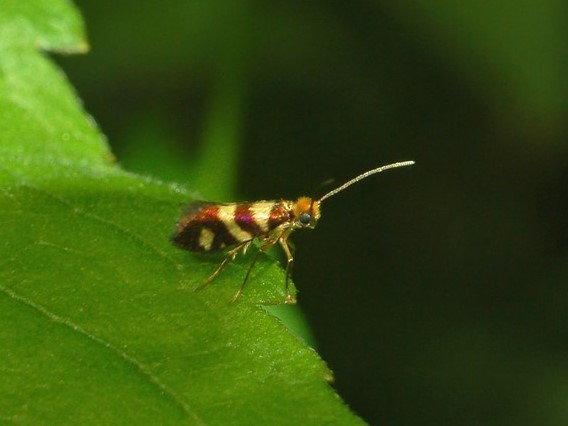

Scientific classification
- Kingdom: Animalia
- Phylum: Arthropoda
- Clade: Pancrustacea
- Class: Insecta
- Order: Lepidoptera
- Family: Micropterigidae
- Genus: Micropterix
- Species: M. tuscaniensis

Binomial name
- Micropterix tuscaniensis Heath, 1960

= Micropterix tuscaniensis =

Species of moth

Micropterix tuscaniensis is a species of moth belonging to the family Micropterigidae. It was described by John Heath in 1960. It is only known from central and southern Italy, where it has been found in the provinces of Tuscany, Calabria, Apulia and Basilicata. However, it is probably distributed throughout the whole of mainland Italy, except for the Alps. Adults are on the wing from late April to early July, depending on the altitude.

The length of the forewings is 3.4–4.3 millimetres (0.13–0.17 in) for males and 3.7–4.7 millimetres (0.15–0.19 in) for females.
