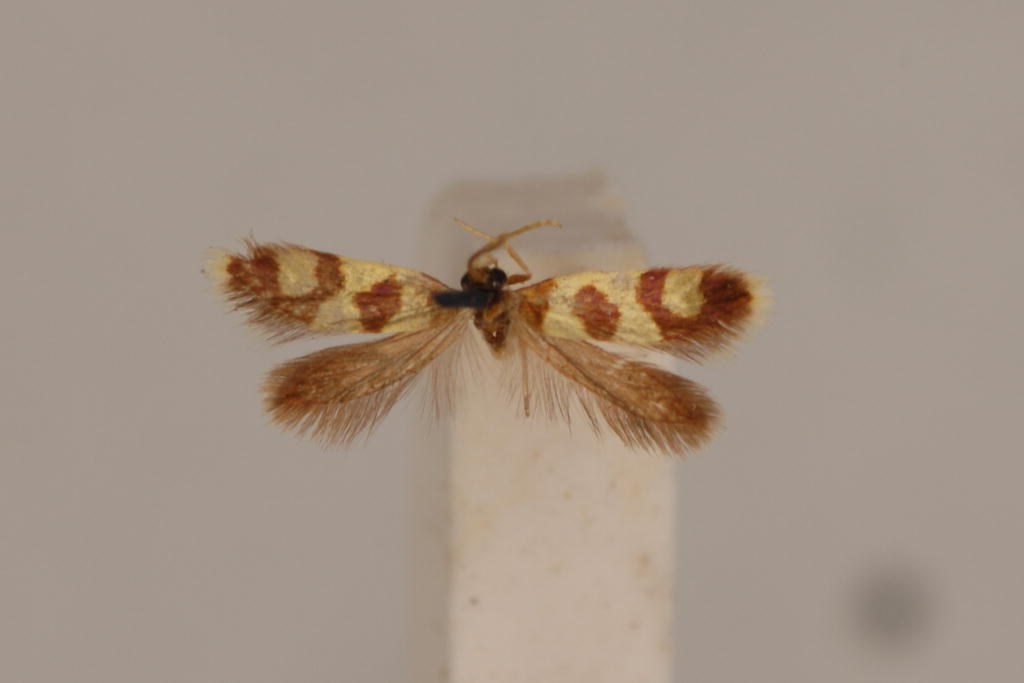

Scientific classification
- Kingdom: Animalia
- Phylum: Arthropoda
- Class: Insecta
- Order: Lepidoptera
- Family: Micropterigidae
- Genus: Micropterix
- Species: M. conjunctella

Binomial name
- Micropterix conjunctella Heath, 1986

= Micropterix conjunctella =

Moth species in family Micropterigidae

Micropterix conjunctella is a species of moth belonging to the family Micropterigidae. It was described by John Heath in 1986, and is endemic to the type locality at Skikda in Algeria.
