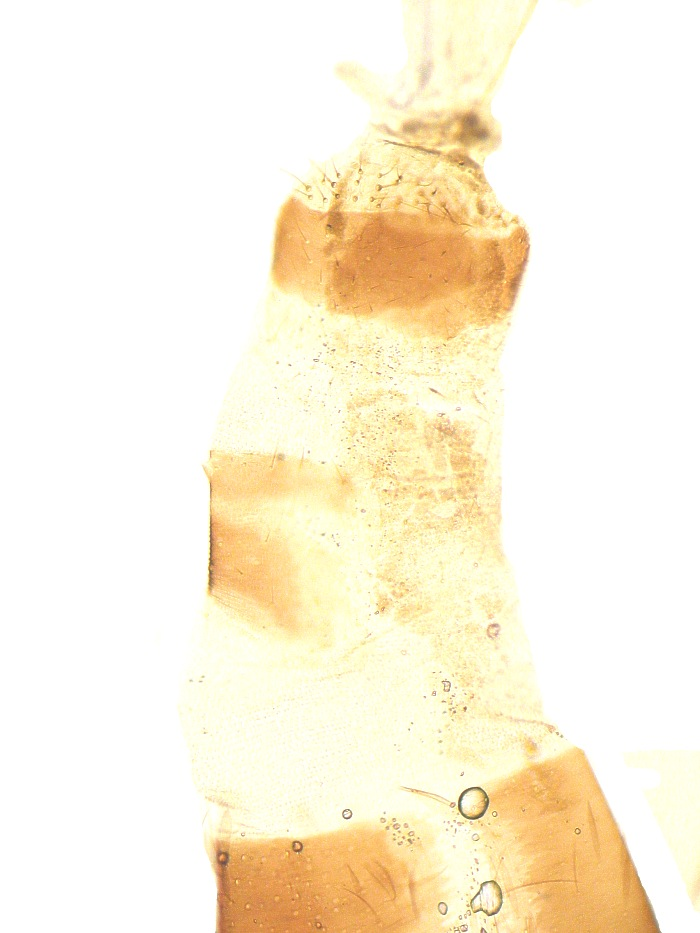

Scientific classification
- Kingdom: Animalia
- Phylum: Arthropoda
- Clade: Pancrustacea
- Class: Insecta
- Order: Lepidoptera
- Family: Micropterigidae
- Genus: Micropterix
- Species: M. garganoensis

Binomial name
- Micropterix garganoensis Heath, 1960

= Micropterix garganoensis =

Species of moth

Micropterix garganoensis is a species of moth belonging to the family Micropterigidae. It was described by Heath in 1960. It is known from Italy. (Gargano)

== Gallery ==
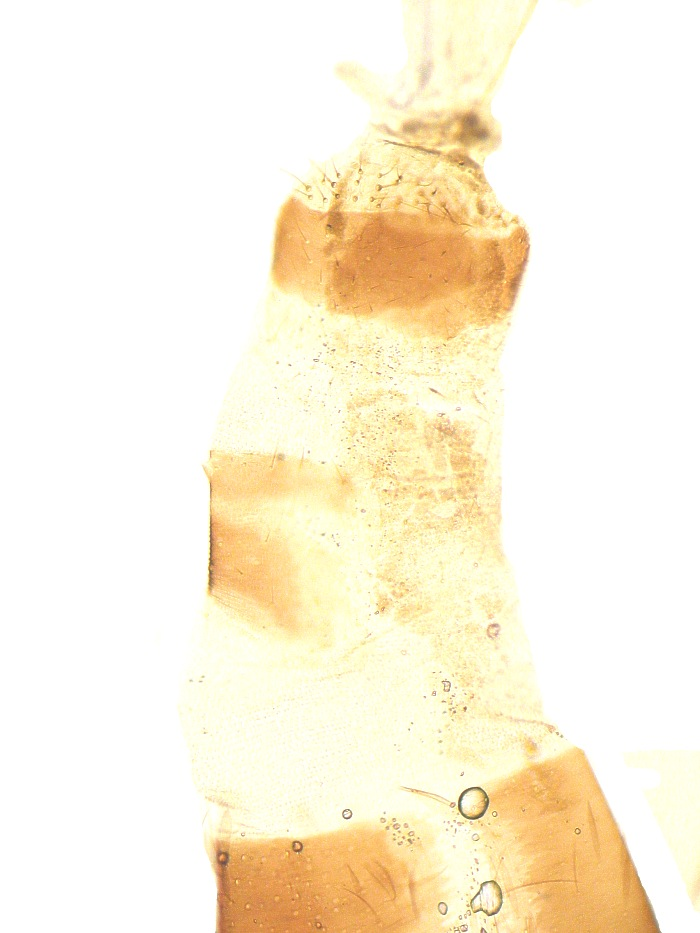
Female genitalia
