= Micropterix hartigi =

Scientific classification
- Kingdom: Animalia
- Phylum: Arthropoda
- Clade: Pancrustacea
- Class: Insecta
- Order: Lepidoptera
- Family: Micropterigidae
- Genus: Micropterix
- Species: M. hartigi

Binomial name
- Micropterix hartigi Heath, 1981

Species of moth

Micropterix hartigi is a species of moth belonging to the family Micropterigidae. It was described by Heath in 1981 and is endemic to Italy.

== Etymology ==
It is named for Italian lepidopterist Friedrich Reichsgraf von Hartig.
