= Micropterix hyrcana =

Scientific classification
- Kingdom: Animalia
- Phylum: Arthropoda
- Class: Insecta
- Order: Lepidoptera
- Family: Micropterigidae
- Genus: Micropterix
- Species: M. hyrcana

Binomial name
- Micropterix hyrcana (Zagulajev, 1993)

Species of moth

Micropterix hyrcana is a species of moth belonging to the family Micropterigidae. It was described by Zagulajev in 1993. It is only known from Hyrcanian woods along the southern coast of the Caspian Sea from Azerbaijan to the Iranian province Golestan.

The habitat consists of edges of deciduous forests. Adults have been caught in June.
