= Micropterix abchasiae =

Scientific classification
- Kingdom: Animalia
- Phylum: Arthropoda
- Clade: Pancrustacea
- Class: Insecta
- Order: Lepidoptera
- Family: Micropterigidae
- Genus: Micropterix
- Species: M. abchasiae

Binomial name
- Micropterix abchasiae Zagulajev, 1983

Synonyms
- Microptericina abchasiae Zagulajev, 1983

Species of moth

Micropterix abchasiae is a species of moth belonging to the family Micropterigidae that was described by Aleksei Zagulyaev in 1983. It is only found in Abkhazia in Georgia.
