= Micropterix trifasciella =

Scientific classification
- Kingdom: Animalia
- Phylum: Arthropoda
- Class: Insecta
- Order: Lepidoptera
- Family: Micropterigidae
- Genus: Micropterix
- Species: M. trifasciella

Binomial name
- Micropterix trifasciella Heath, 1965

Species of moth

Micropterix trifasciella is a species of moth belonging to the family Micropterigidae and was described by John Heath in 1965. It is recorded in the French and Italian Alps, and is known to inhabit herbaceous plants at an elevation range of 1,400–1,900 metres (4,600–6,200 ft). Male Micropterix trifasciella have a wingspan of 3.4–4.7 millimetres (0.13–0.19 in), while females have a wingspan of 4.2–4.8 millimetres (0.17–0.19 in).
