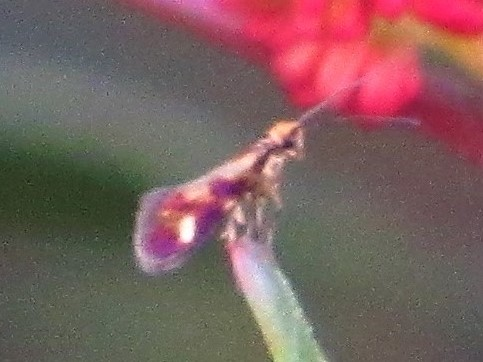

Scientific classification
- Kingdom: Animalia
- Phylum: Arthropoda
- Class: Insecta
- Order: Lepidoptera
- Family: Micropterigidae
- Genus: Micropterix
- Species: M. granatensis

Binomial name
- Micropterix granatensis Heath, 1981

= Micropterix granatensis =

Species of moth

Micropterix granatensis is a species of moth belonging to the family Micropterigidae. It was described by John Heath in 1981. It is known from the Iberian Peninsula.
