= Micropterix montanella =

Scientific classification
- Kingdom: Animalia
- Phylum: Arthropoda
- Class: Insecta
- Order: Lepidoptera
- Family: Micropterigidae
- Genus: Micropterix
- Species: M. montanella

Binomial name
- Micropterix montanella (Zagulajev, 1983)

Species of moth

Micropterix montanella is a species of moth belonging to the family Micropterigidae. It was described by Zagulajev in 1983. It is known from Abkhazia, Georgia, including Adjara and along the Caucasian coast of the Black Sea.

The wingspan is 7–8 millimetres (0.28–0.31 in) for males and 8.8–9.8 millimetres (0.35–0.39 in) for females.
