= Micropterix eatoniella =

Scientific classification
- Kingdom: Animalia
- Phylum: Arthropoda
- Class: Insecta
- Order: Lepidoptera
- Family: Micropterigidae
- Genus: Micropterix
- Species: M. eatoniella

Binomial name
- Micropterix eatoniella Heath, 1986

Species of moth

Micropterix eatoniella is a species of moth belonging to the family Micropterigidae. It was described by Heath in 1986. It is only known from the type locality Annaba in Algeria.
