= Micropterix montosiella =

Scientific classification
- Kingdom: Animalia
- Phylum: Arthropoda
- Class: Insecta
- Order: Lepidoptera
- Family: Micropterigidae
- Genus: Micropterix
- Species: M. montosiella

Binomial name
- Micropterix montosiella (Zagulajev, 1983)

Species of moth

Micropterix montosiella is a species of moth belonging to the family Micropterigidae. It was described by Zagulajev in 1983.
