= Micropterix cypriensis =

Scientific classification
- Kingdom: Animalia
- Phylum: Arthropoda
- Class: Insecta
- Order: Lepidoptera
- Family: Micropterigidae
- Genus: Micropterix
- Species: M. cypriensis

Binomial name
- Micropterix cypriensis Heath, 1985

Species of moth

Micropterix cypriensis is a species of moth belonging to the family Micropterigidae, and was first described by John Heath in 1985 from specimens collected in Cyprus. The holotype male was collected from Yermasoyia, Limassol on 11 March 1979 and is now in the Natural History Museum, Stockholm. It was thought to be the first time a Micropterix had been recorded on Cyprus and it is an endemic species of that island.

== Taxonomy ==
Micropterix cypriensis was described in 1985 by the English lepidopterist J. Heath based on specimens collected from Cyprus. The species is most closely related to M. elegans, differing from that species in the appearance of the forewing and the male genitalia.

== Description ==
Males have a forewing length of 2.5–2.8 mm and a total wing expanse of 5.2–5.9 mm, while females have a forewing length of 2.8–3.0 mm and a wing expanse of 6.0–6.5 mm. The thorax is brownish-gold, while the tegulae are bronzy-gold. The forewings are mostly golden with diffuse silver scales and purple edges at the tip of the costa. There is a narrow fascia at one-third, curved fascia at one-half, and a big costal spot and a small dorsal spot at two-thirds. There is a small costal spot near the tip of the forewing and a larger spot further from the tip, both silver in color. The hindwing is bronzy-brown, with a purple tint towards the tip. The cilia and abdomen are brownish-gold.

The uncus is long and thin. The long, arched accessory clasper has six thin, flattened setae on the inner side of the back edge. There is a long lobe between the accessory clasper and valva. The valva is stout and somewhat flattened and has long, stout setae on the inner side of the end further from the body, as well as two thin setae near the base.

== Distribution ==
It is endemic to Cyprus and is the only species in the genus Micropterix known from that island. The type specimens were collected from Germasogeia in Limassol District.
