= Micropterix aureocapilla =

Scientific classification
- Kingdom: Animalia
- Phylum: Arthropoda
- Clade: Pancrustacea
- Class: Insecta
- Order: Lepidoptera
- Family: Micropterigidae
- Genus: Micropterix
- Species: M. aureocapilla

Binomial name
- Micropterix aureocapilla Heath, 1986

Species of moth

Micropterix aureocapilla is a species of moth belonging to the family Micropterigidae. It was described by John Heath in 1986, and is known only from the type locality, El Hadjar in Algeria.
