= Micropterix aureopennella =

Scientific classification
- Kingdom: Animalia
- Phylum: Arthropoda
- Clade: Pancrustacea
- Class: Insecta
- Order: Lepidoptera
- Family: Micropterigidae
- Genus: Micropterix
- Species: M. aureopennella

Binomial name
- Micropterix aureopennella Heath, 1986

Species of moth

Micropterix aureopennella is a species of moth belonging to the family Micropterigidae. It was described by John Heath in 1986, and is known from Algeria.

The wingspan is about 74 millimetres (2.9 in).
