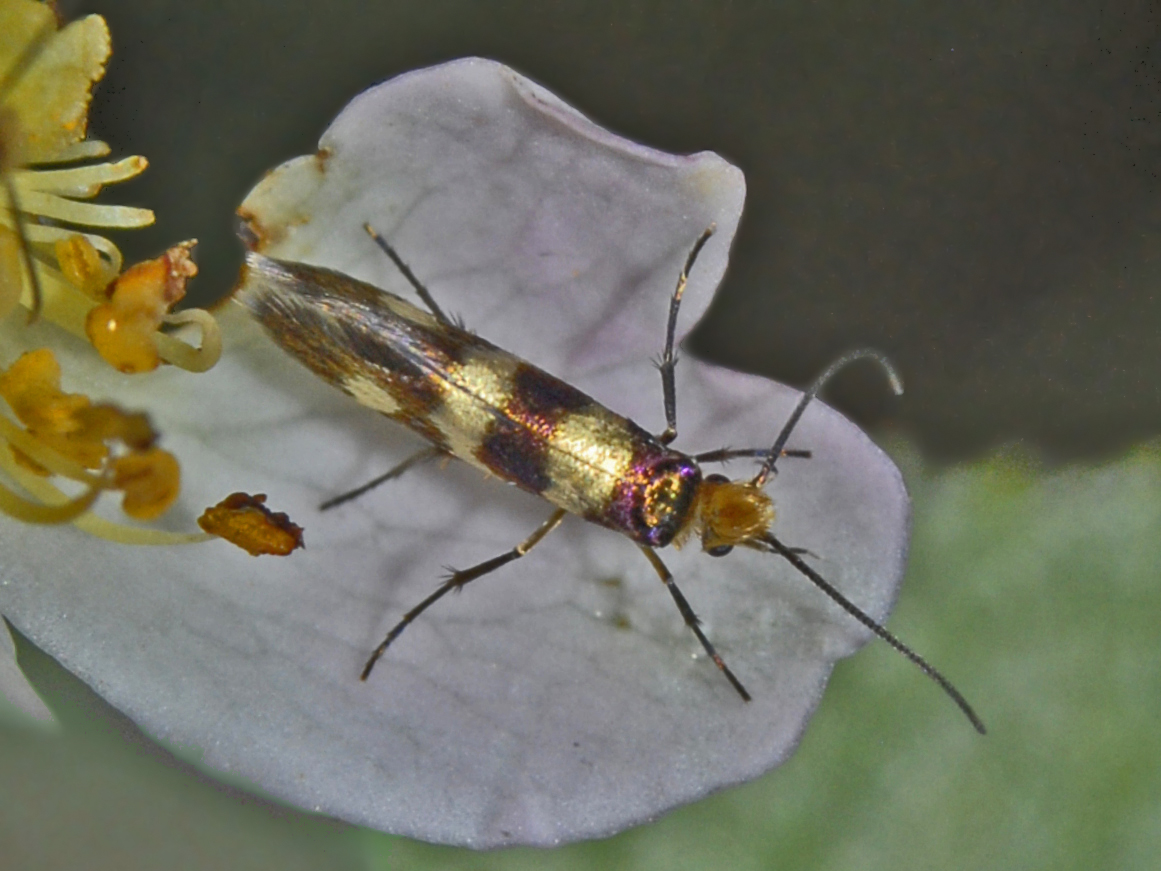

Scientific classification
- Kingdom: Animalia
- Phylum: Arthropoda
- Clade: Pancrustacea
- Class: Insecta
- Order: Lepidoptera
- Family: Micropterigidae
- Genus: Micropterix
- Species: M. allionella

Binomial name
- Micropterix allionella (Fabricius, 1794)

Synonyms
- Tinea allionella Fabricius, 1794; Tinea tricinctella Costa, 1836

= Micropterix allionella =

Species of moth

Micropterix allionella is a moth of the family Micropterigidae. It was described by Johan Christian Fabricius in 1794.

== Distribution ==
This species is present in France, Italy, Germany, Switzerland, Austria, the Czech Republic, Slovakia, Bulgaria, Croatia, Slovenia and former Yugoslavia.

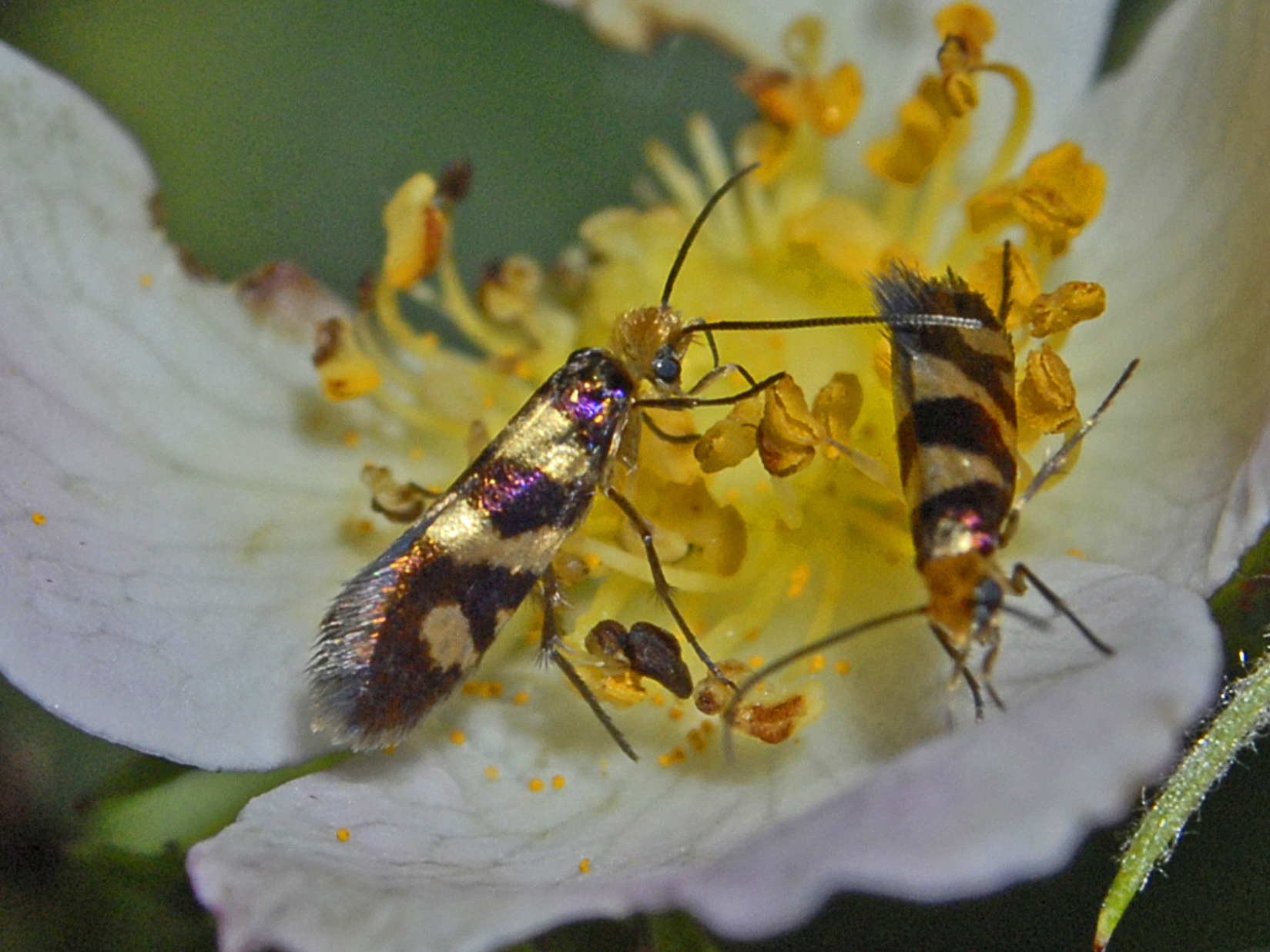

== Habitat ==
These moths live in clearings and in the outskirts of forests. They usually fly in tall herbaceous vegetation.

== Description ==
The length of the forewings is 3.6–4.5 millimetres (0.14–0.18 in) for males and 4.7–4.8 millimetres (0.19–0.19 in) for females. Head is black brown, with hairy-like yellow scales. Forewings are purplish violet with broad transversal golden fasciae, an outer golden margin and a small costal golden spot. This species is very similar to Micropterix rothenbachii, that have broader golden fasciae.

== Bibliography ==
- Fabricius, J. C. (1794): Entomologia systematica emendata et aucta. Secundum classes, ordines, genera, species adjectis synonimis, locis, observationibus, descriptionibus 3 (2): 1-349. Hafniae (C. G. Proft, Fil. et Soc.).
