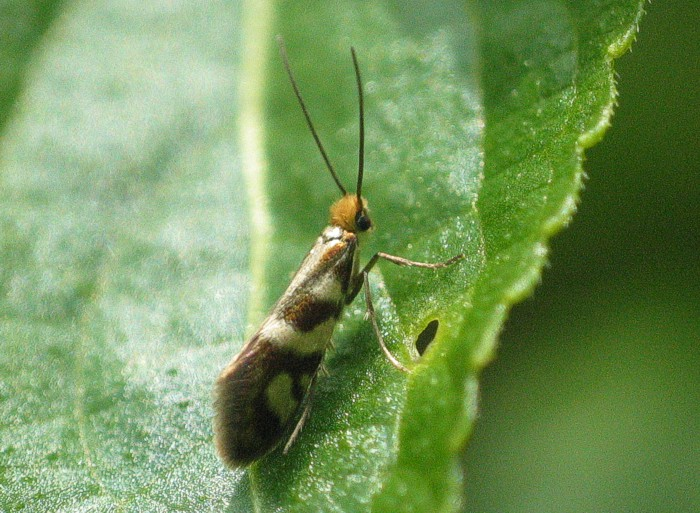

Scientific classification
- Kingdom: Animalia
- Phylum: Arthropoda
- Class: Insecta
- Order: Lepidoptera
- Family: Micropterigidae
- Genus: Micropterix
- Species: M. schaefferi

Binomial name
- Micropterix schaefferi Heath, 1975

Synonyms
- Micropteryx anderschella Herrich-Schäffer, 1855

= Micropterix schaefferi =

Species of moth

Micropterix schaefferi is a species of moth belonging to the family Micropterigidae that was described by John Heath in 1975. Male Micropterix schaefferi have a wingspan of 3.8–5.1 millimetres (0.15–0.20 in), while females have a wingspan of 4.7–5.8 millimetres (0.19–0.23 in). It is known from France, Corsica, Italy, Belgium, the Netherlands, Germany, Switzerland, Austria, Hungary, Czech Republic, Bulgaria, Denmark, and Poland. Moths in this species inhabit woodlands with many beech and coniferous trees, and are also known to inhabit moist ravine forests and dry pine forests.
