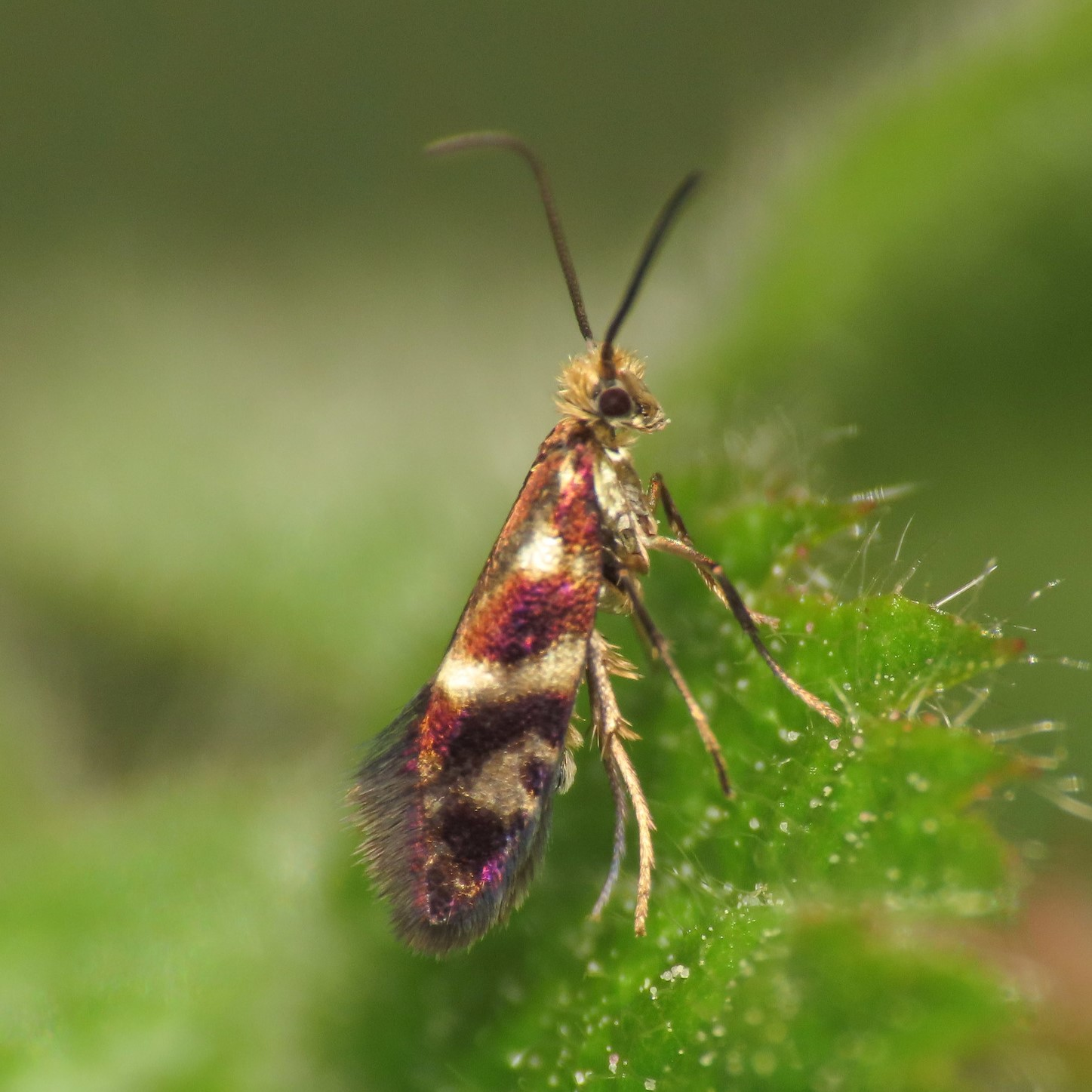

Scientific classification
- Kingdom: Animalia
- Phylum: Arthropoda
- Clade: Pancrustacea
- Class: Insecta
- Order: Lepidoptera
- Family: Micropterigidae
- Genus: Micropterix
- Species: M. vulturensis

Binomial name
- Micropterix vulturensis Heath, 1981

= Micropterix vulturensis =

Species of moth

Micropterix vulturensis is a species of moth in the family Micropterigidae. It was first described by John Heath in 1981. It is widely distributed in the central and southern Apennines.

The length of the forewings is 3.5-4.2 mm for males and 4.2–5 mm for females.
