= Micropterix lagodechiella =

Scientific classification
- Kingdom: Animalia
- Phylum: Arthropoda
- Class: Insecta
- Order: Lepidoptera
- Family: Micropterigidae
- Genus: Micropterix
- Species: M. lagodechiella

Binomial name
- Micropterix lagodechiella (Zagulajev, 1987)

Species of moth

Micropterix lagodechiella is a species of moth belonging to the family Micropterigidae. It was described by Zagulajev in 1987.
