= Micropterix zangheriella =

Scientific classification
- Kingdom: Animalia
- Phylum: Arthropoda
- Clade: Pancrustacea
- Class: Insecta
- Order: Lepidoptera
- Family: Micropterigidae
- Genus: Micropterix
- Species: M. zangheriella

Binomial name
- Micropterix zangheriella Heath, 1963

Species of moth

Micropterix zangheriella is a species of moth belonging to the family Micropterigidae. It was described by John Heath in 1963. It is only known from the northern Apennines and has been found only in the Emilia-Romagna so far.

The habitat consists of clearings and edges of beech- and mixed beech-forests with well structured underwoods.

The length of the forewings is 3,85 mm for males and 4,3–5 mm for females.
