= Micropterix kardamylensis =

Scientific classification
- Kingdom: Animalia
- Phylum: Arthropoda
- Class: Insecta
- Order: Lepidoptera
- Family: Micropterigidae
- Genus: Micropterix
- Species: M. kardamylensis

Binomial name
- Micropterix kardamylensis Rebel, 1903

Species of moth

Micropterix kardamylensis is a species of moth belonging to the family Micropterigidae. It was described by Hans Rebel in 1903. It is found in the southern Peloponnese in Greece. There are also records from Bosnia and Herzegovina, Montenegro, North Macedonia, Albania and Bulgaria, but these might be Micropterix tunbergella instead.

The wingspan is 6.25-6.75 mm for males and 6.7-9.5 mm for females.

It was found on Pistacia lentiscus.
