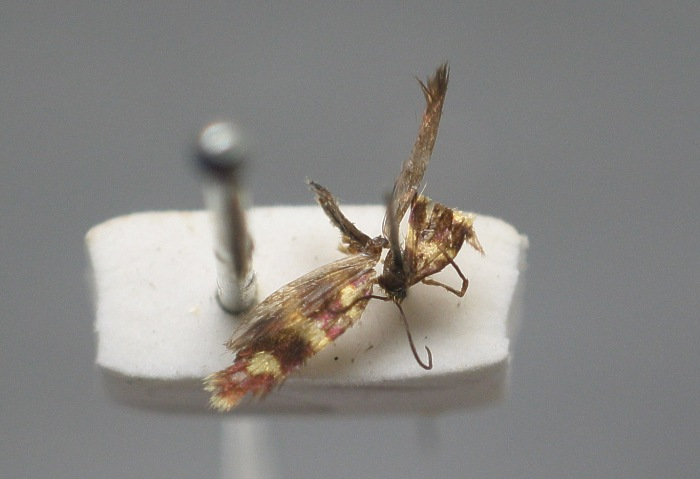

Scientific classification
- Kingdom: Animalia
- Phylum: Arthropoda
- Class: Insecta
- Order: Lepidoptera
- Family: Micropterigidae
- Genus: Micropterix
- Species: M. cornuella

Binomial name
- Micropterix cornuella Lees, Rougerie, Zeller & Kristensen, 2010

= Micropterix cornuella =

Species of moth

Micropterix cornuella is a species of moth belonging to the family Micropterigidae. It was described by Lees, Rougerie, Zeller & Kristensen in 2010. It is only known from the type locality in Mishmi Hills, Arunachal Pradesh north-eastern India.
