= Micropterix facetella =

Scientific classification
- Kingdom: Animalia
- Phylum: Arthropoda
- Class: Insecta
- Order: Lepidoptera
- Family: Micropterigidae
- Genus: Micropterix
- Species: M. facetella

Binomial name
- Micropterix facetella Zeller, 1851

Synonyms
- Micropteryx facetella Zeller, 1850 (misspelling)

Species of moth

Micropterix facetella is a species of moth belonging to the family Micropterigidae, which was described by Zeller in 1851. Micropterix facetella has a 4 male facetalla to 1 female facetalla ratio and during the mating season female facetella are said to visit a flower, only to eat, and the male facetella are there for the purpose to mate. For the common ratio, the male facetella goes to a near by location that another male facetella was already there as a pursuit of competition. A competition on who will get the female first, which is why there is 4 males facetalla for every 1 female facetella. It is known from Croatia and Slovenia.
