= Micropterix cassinella =

Scientific classification
- Kingdom: Animalia
- Phylum: Arthropoda
- Clade: Pancrustacea
- Class: Insecta
- Order: Lepidoptera
- Family: Micropterigidae
- Genus: Micropterix
- Species: M. cassinella

Binomial name
- Micropterix cassinella M. A. Kurz, M. E. Kurz & Zeller, 2010

Moth species in family Micropterigidae

Micropterix cassinella is a species of moth belonging to the family Micropterigidae. It was described by Michael A. Kurz, Marion E. Kurz and Hans Christof Zeller-Lukashort in 2010 and is endemic to Italy. At present, it is only known from the provinces of Lazio and Campagna in the central Apennines.

Adults are on wing from May to late July, depending on the altitude. Adults were found swarming around tall herbaceous vegetation and around flowers of Pistacia lentiscus.

The forewing length is 2.7–3.3 millimetres (0.11–0.13 in) for males and 3–4 millimetres (0.12–0.16 in) for females.
