= Micropterix gertraudae =

Scientific classification
- Domain: Eukaryota
- Kingdom: Animalia
- Phylum: Arthropoda
- Class: Insecta
- Order: Lepidoptera
- Family: Micropterigidae
- Genus: Micropterix
- Species: M. gertraudae

Binomial name
- Micropterix gertraudae Kurz M. A & M. E. Kurz, 2010

Extinct species of moth

Micropterix gertraudae is an extinct species of moth belonging to the family Micropterigidae. It was described by Kurz M. A & M. E. Kurz in 2010. It is only known from the single type specimen in Baltic amber, which has been mined at Palmnicken (now Yantarnyy) near Kaliningrad.
