= M. elegans =

M. elegans may refer to:

- Madia elegans, a flowering plant species native to western North America
- Malurus elegans, the red-winged fairywren, a passerine bird species endemic to the southwestern corner of Western Australia
- Mantidactylus elegans, a frog species endemic to Madagascar
- Martensia elegans, a red alga species found in South African
- Merodon elegans, a fly species in the genus Merodon
- Mesochernes elegans, a pseudoscorpion species found in Venezuela
- Micropterix elegans, a moth species known from Israel
- Mutinus elegans, the elegant stinkhorn, the dog stinkhorn, the headless stinkhorn or the devil's dipstick, a fungus saprobic species found during summer and autumn in Europe and eastern North America
- Myristica elegans, a plant species in the genus Myristica

== Synonyms ==
- Marginella elegans, a synonym for Cryptospira elegans, a sea snail species
