= Micropterix purpureopennella =

Scientific classification
- Kingdom: Animalia
- Phylum: Arthropoda
- Class: Insecta
- Order: Lepidoptera
- Family: Micropterigidae
- Genus: Micropterix
- Species: M. purpureopennella

Binomial name
- Micropterix purpureopennella Heath, 1986

Species of moth

Micropterix purpureopennella is a species of moth belonging to the family Micropterigidae. It was described by Heath in 1986. It is known from Algeria.
