= Micropterix sikhotealinensis =

Scientific classification
- Kingdom: Animalia
- Phylum: Arthropoda
- Class: Insecta
- Order: Lepidoptera
- Family: Micropterigidae
- Genus: Micropterix
- Species: M. sikhotealinensis

Binomial name
- Micropterix sikhotealinensis Ponomarenko & Beljaev, 2000

Species of moth

Micropterix sikhotealinensis is a species of moth belonging to the family Micropterigidae. It is endemic to Russia where it was described by Margarita Gennadievna Ponomarenko and Eugene Anatolievich Beljaev in 2000.
