= Micropterix jabalmoussae =

Scientific classification
- Kingdom: Animalia
- Phylum: Arthropoda
- Class: Insecta
- Order: Lepidoptera
- Family: Micropterigidae
- Genus: Micropterix
- Species: M. jabalmoussae

Binomial name
- Micropterix jabalmoussae Zeller, Kullberg & Kurz, 2016

Species of moth

Micropterix jabalmoussae is a moth of the family Micropterigidae. It is known from the Jabal Moussa Biosphere Reserve in Lebanon, after which the species is named.

== Appearance ==
Adults have a wing span of 3.5–3.6 mm. The ground colour of both fore- and hindwings is gold-bronze. Apically, forewings and hindwings have a purplish hue. The hindwings are not further marked, while the forewings have several silvery-white markings: two narrow bands across the wing's full width (at respectively 1/4th and 1/2nd of the wing's length), as well as an oval to rectangular spot at 3/4th.
