= Micropterix ibericella =

Scientific classification
- Kingdom: Animalia
- Phylum: Arthropoda
- Class: Insecta
- Order: Lepidoptera
- Family: Micropterigidae
- Genus: Micropterix
- Species: M. ibericella

Binomial name
- Micropterix ibericella Caradja, 1920

Synonyms
- Micropteryx rebeli Viette, 1949

Species of moth

Micropterix ibericella is a species of moth belonging to the family Micropterigidae. It was described by Aristide Caradja in 1920. It is known from the Iberian Peninsula.
