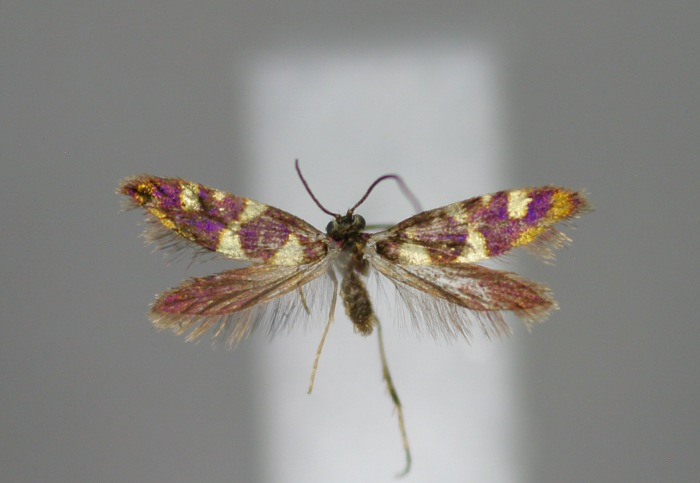

Scientific classification
- Kingdom: Animalia
- Phylum: Arthropoda
- Class: Insecta
- Order: Lepidoptera
- Family: Micropterigidae
- Genus: Micropterix
- Species: M. igaloensis

Binomial name
- Micropterix igaloensis Amsel, 1951

= Micropterix igaloensis =

Species of moth

Micropterix igaloensis is a species of moth belonging to the family Micropterigidae. It was described by Hans Georg Amsel in 1951 and is only known from Montenegro.

The length of the forewings is about 4 mm.
