= Micropterix anglica =

Scientific classification
- Domain: Eukaryota
- Kingdom: Animalia
- Phylum: Arthropoda
- Class: Insecta
- Order: Lepidoptera
- Family: Micropterigidae
- Genus: Micropterix
- Species: †M. anglica

Binomial name
- †Micropterix anglica Jarzembowski, 1980

Species of insect

Micropterix anglica is an extinct species of moth belonging to the family Micropterigidae which was described by Edmund A Jarzembowski in 1980.

Only a single known specimen, from the Oligocene, has been found on the Isle of Wight. It consists of greater part of a forewing. Its original length estimated at 4 millimetres (0.16 in). The veins are mostly dark brown with intervening membrane light brown.
