= Micropterix isobasella =

Scientific classification
- Kingdom: Animalia
- Phylum: Arthropoda
- Class: Insecta
- Order: Lepidoptera
- Family: Micropterigidae
- Genus: Micropterix
- Species: M. isobasella

Binomial name
- Micropterix isobasella Staudinger, 1871

Synonyms
- Micropterix isobasella f. weberi Müller-Rutz, 1927

Species of moth

Micropterix isobasella is a species of moth belonging to the family Micropterigidae. It has a restricted alpine distribution in southern Switzerland and northern Italy.

This is a small moth with a forewing length of up to 4.4 millimetres (0.17 in). The forewings are gold-coloured with a greenish tinge and, unlike many of its congeners, have little or no patterning. Very little is known about the life history of this species and the larva and pupa are unknown.
