= Micropterix corcyrella =

Scientific classification
- Kingdom: Animalia
- Phylum: Arthropoda
- Class: Insecta
- Order: Lepidoptera
- Family: Micropterigidae
- Genus: Micropterix
- Species: M. corcyrella

Binomial name
- Micropterix corcyrella Walsingham, 1919

Synonyms
- Micropterix jeanneli Viette, 1949

Species of moth

Micropterix corcyrella is a species of moth belonging to the family Micropterigidae. It was described by Walsingham, Lord Thomas de Grey, in 1919. It is found in Slovenia, Serbia and Montenegro, North Macedonia, Bulgaria and Greece.

The wingspan is about 6.5 millimetres (0.26 in).

== Subspecies ==
- Micropterix corcyrella corcyrella Walsingham, 1919 (Greece, Bulgaria, North Macedonia)
- Micropterix corcyrella cephaloniensis Kurz, Kurz & Zeller, 2004 (Kefallinia)
