= Micropterix myrtetella =

Scientific classification
- Kingdom: Animalia
- Phylum: Arthropoda
- Clade: Pancrustacea
- Class: Insecta
- Order: Lepidoptera
- Family: Micropterigidae
- Genus: Micropterix
- Species: M. myrtetella

Binomial name
- Micropterix myrtetella Zeller, 1850

Species of moth

Micropterix myrtetella is a species of moth belonging to the family Micropterigidae. It was described by Philipp Christoph Zeller in 1850. It is found in Italy, Austria, the Czech Republic, Slovakia, Hungary, Croatia, Serbia and Montenegro, Albania, North Macedonia, Bulgaria, Greece, Romania and Ukraine.

The length of the forewings is 2.2–2.8 millimetres (0.087–0.110 in) for males and 2.7–3 millimetres (0.11–0.12 in) for females.

== Subspecies ==
- Micropterix myrtetella myrtetella
- Micropterix myrtetella idae Rebel, 1902 (Greece)
