= Micropterix wockei =

Scientific classification
- Kingdom: Animalia
- Phylum: Arthropoda
- Class: Insecta
- Order: Lepidoptera
- Family: Micropterigidae
- Genus: Micropterix
- Species: M. wockei

Binomial name
- Micropterix wockei Staudinger, 1871

Species of moth

Micropterix wockei is a species of moth belonging to the family Micropterigidae. It was described by Otto Staudinger in 1871. It is named after Maximilian Ferdinand Wocke. It is known from Greece.

The length of the forewings is 3.4 mm for males and 4.2 mm for females.
