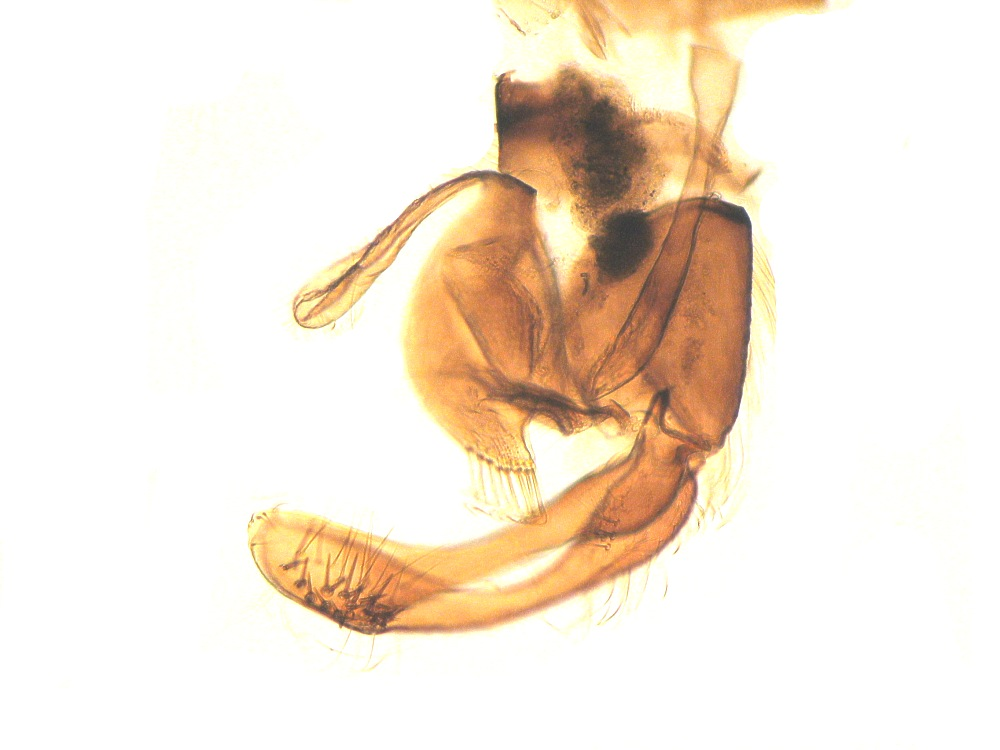
- Micropterix islamella, male genitalia

Scientific classification
- Kingdom: Animalia
- Phylum: Arthropoda
- Class: Insecta
- Order: Lepidoptera
- Family: Micropterigidae
- Genus: Micropterix
- Species: M. islamella

Binomial name
- Micropterix islamella Amsel, 1935

= Micropterix islamella =

Species of moth

Micropterix islamella is a species of moth belonging to the family Micropterigidae. It was described by Hans Georg Amsel in 1935. It is known from Palestine.
