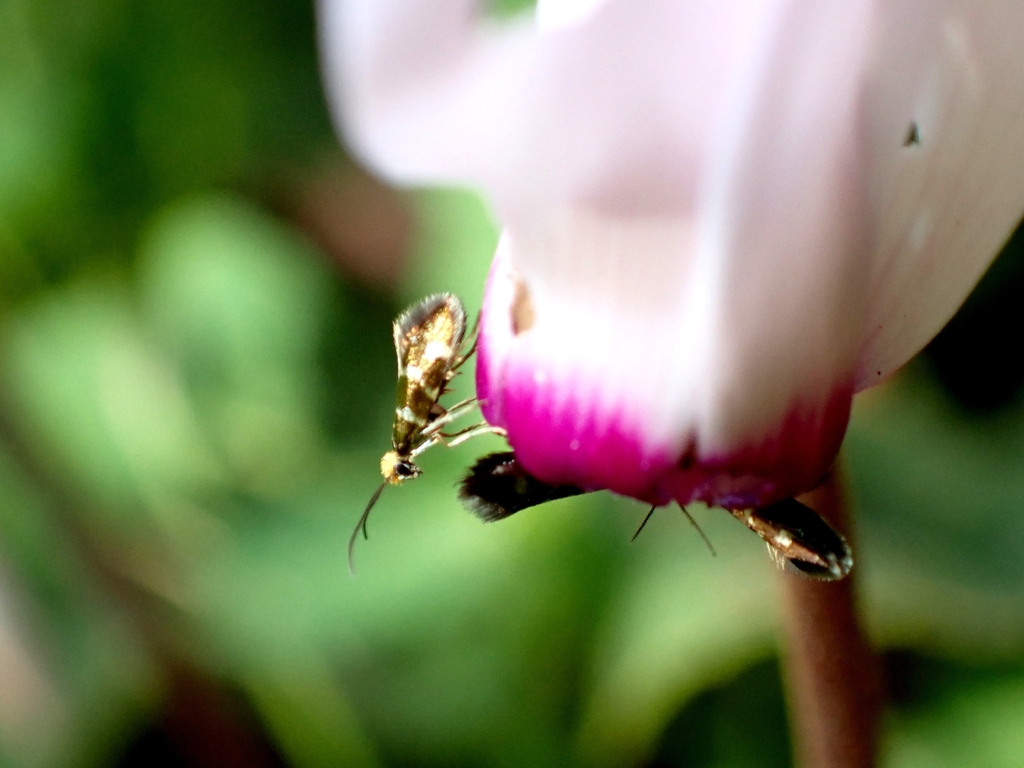

Scientific classification
- Kingdom: Animalia
- Phylum: Arthropoda
- Clade: Pancrustacea
- Class: Insecta
- Order: Lepidoptera
- Family: Micropterigidae
- Genus: Micropterix
- Species: M. berytella

Binomial name
- Micropterix berytella de Joannis, 1886

= Micropterix berytella =

Species of moth

Micropterix berytella is a species of moth belonging to the family Micropterigidae, which is endemic to Israel. It was described by Joseph de Joannis in 1886.

Adults are important pollinators of Persian cyclamen (Cyclamen persicum).
