= Micropterix emiliensis =

Scientific classification
- Kingdom: Animalia
- Phylum: Arthropoda
- Clade: Pancrustacea
- Class: Insecta
- Order: Lepidoptera
- Family: Micropterigidae
- Genus: Micropterix
- Species: M. emiliensis

Binomial name
- Micropterix emiliensis Viette, 1950

Species of moth

Micropterix emiliensis is a species of moth belonging to the family Micropterigidae that was described by Viette in 1950, and is endemic to Italy.
