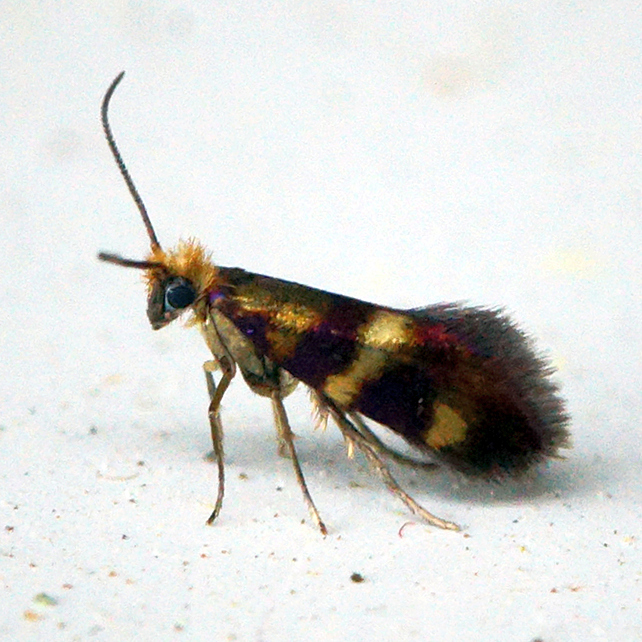

Scientific classification
- Kingdom: Animalia
- Phylum: Arthropoda
- Clade: Pancrustacea
- Class: Insecta
- Order: Lepidoptera
- Family: Micropterigidae
- Genus: Micropterix
- Species: M. aglaella

Binomial name
- Micropterix aglaella (Duponchel, 1840)

Synonyms
- Adela aglaella Duponchel, 1840

= Micropterix aglaella =

Species of moth

Micropterix aglaella is a species of moth belonging to the family Micropterigidae.It is found in southern France, south-western Switzerland and northern Italy.

== Taxonomy ==
Adela aglaella Duponchel, 1840: 627: According to Minet (in litt.) the year of description has to be corrected to 1840 (all types are labelled as Micropterix aglaella Duponchel, 1840 instead of 1838).

Type locality: Central and Southern France (including "Fonscolombe", north of Aix-en-Provence).
Type: Syntype in coll. MNHN (Minet in litt.).
Synonyms, misspellings, wrong determinations, etc.:

== Description ==
Forewing length: male 3.3–3.6 millimetres (0.13–0.14 in); female 3.5–4.3 millimetres (0.14–0.17 in). Head black brown, vestiture of hair-like scales on the head white to rusty yellow; antennae dark brown, golden shining with a purple tinge, nearly 4/5 (male), respectively, nearly 3/5 (female) of forewing length. Thorax bronzy golden, posteriorly reddish to purple, tegulae coppery to purple violet; ground colour of forewing reddish golden to purple violet, distal half sometimes purplish brown, outer margin sometimes reddish golden again, apex rarely also of this colour; a bronzy golden colouration from the base to 1/4, leaving a purple violet basal spot at costa; markings light golden to golden, delicately bordered in bronzy gold: a broad fascia at 1/2, slightly bent outwards, extending across the whole width of the forewing; sometimes a small costal spot at 3/5 (found in 7 of 17 specimens); a larger, almost round to slightly oval spot at 3/4, extending from costa across more than half of, sometimes even across the whole forewing width (in the latter case the posterior part of this fascia is bronzy golden); fringe golden, basally purple coloured, outwards whitish; hindwing bronzy golden, with an intense purple tinge; fringe bronzy golden, outwards whitish; legs and abdomen brown, golden shining.

== Anatomy ==
Male genitalia. Uncus moderately long, stout, with a broad, rounded tip; beyond the uncus a weak structure of hair-like setae; between uncus and accessory claspers, situated at the anterior margin of the tegumen, there are weakly sclerotized, elongated, spatulate-like lobes, somewhat variable in length; these lobes with very long hair-like setae at their ends, as well as on a small appendix at their lower margin; accessory claspers spoon-like, with a row of nearly 13 moderately long to long, mostly sickle-shaped thickened setae; near the dorsal margin anteriorly two shorter, straight spinoid setae and basally a row of about 6 strongly modified, very broad T-shaped thickened setae; valvae moderately long, stout, strongly constricted medially; at their inner margin basally a very long and a shorter seta, on the distal part a group of very short to rather long spinoid setae, clustered proximally towards the constriction; a row of short spinoid setae along the rounded anterior margin.

Female genitalia. Tergite IX missing, only indicated by a group of setae; sternite IX strongly reduced, weakly sclerotized, constricted medially. Terminal papillae consisting of two somewhat weakly sclerotized plates forming a band; receptaculum seminis more or less short and stout, the second half like a sac, with typical striation; vestibulum a large sac, without any special characters.

== Diagnosis ==
M. aglaella can be confused with Micropterix paykullella (Fabricius, 1794), but in most cases it can be recognized by its less intense purple colouration. In contrast to M. paykullella and Micropterix aureoviridella (Höfner, 1898), the golden inner margin of M. aglaella does not reach the fascia in the middle (the border of the bronzy golden inner part of the wing and the fascia in the middle are often nearly parallel). In many cases, the outer spot at 3/4 extends across the entire width of the forewing. M. aglaella can also be separated from M. aureoviridella by the normally more acute shape of its markings, the darker purple colouration and by its consistently bronzy golden forewing base.

The male genitalia resemble somewhat those of Micropterix aureatella (Scopoli, 1763), but can be easily distinguished. Also, the female genitalia can be recognized quite well. In particular, the degree of sclerotization of sternite IX and of the terminal papillae of M. aglaella is distinctly weaker than that of M. paykullella. The receptaculum seminis seems to be shorter and stouter, but these differences are too minor to be useful.

Phylogeny: In the male genitalia, M. aglaella has distinct lobes with long, hair-like setae on the posterior margin of the tegumen, between uncus and accessory claspers. Additionally, the valves are relatively short and stout. Thus the species is assumed tentatively to be a relative of M. aureatella, Micropterix sikhotealinensis Ponomarenko & Beljaev, 2000, Micropterix herminiella Corley, 2007 and Micropterix wockei Staudinger, 1870.

== Biology ==
When he described this moth, Duponchel mentioned that it was associated with the flowers of wild privet, elder and common dogwood. Ruedi Bryner however (see Kurz et al. 2009a), has found M. aglaella on blossoms of Dactylis glomerata and Rubus (Rubus) sect. Rubus. The flight period of the imagines reaches from the end of may (one record only) to July (Kurz et al. 2009a).
