= Micropterix erctella =

Scientific classification
- Kingdom: Animalia
- Phylum: Arthropoda
- Clade: Pancrustacea
- Class: Insecta
- Order: Lepidoptera
- Family: Micropterigidae
- Genus: Micropterix
- Species: M. erctella

Binomial name
- Micropterix erctella Walsingham, 1919

Synonyms
- Micropteryx erctella Walsingham, 1919 (misspelling)

Species of moth

Micropterix erctella is a species of moth belonging to the family Micropterigidae which was described by Walsingham, Lord Thomas de Grey, in 1919. It is endemic to Sicily.

The wingspan is about 7 millimetres (0.28 in) for males and 6 millimetres (0.24 in) for females.
