= Micropterix croatica =

Scientific classification
- Kingdom: Animalia
- Phylum: Arthropoda
- Class: Insecta
- Order: Lepidoptera
- Family: Micropterigidae
- Genus: Micropterix
- Species: M. croatica

Binomial name
- Micropterix croatica Heath & Kaltenbach, 1984

Species of moth

Micropterix croatica is a species of moth belonging to the family Micropterigidae. It was described by Heath & Kaltenbach, 1984. It is known from Italy, Slovenia and Croatia.

The wingspan is 6.4–6.7 millimetres (0.25–0.26 in).
