= Micropterix jacobella =

Scientific classification
- Kingdom: Animalia
- Phylum: Arthropoda
- Class: Insecta
- Order: Lepidoptera
- Family: Micropterigidae
- Genus: Micropterix
- Species: M. jacobella

Binomial name
- Micropterix jacobella Walsingham, 1901

Species of moth

Micropterix jacobella is a species of moth belonging to the family Micropterigidae. It was described by Walsingham, Lord Thomas de Grey, in 1901. It is known from Morocco and Tunisia and is probably also present in Algeria.

The wingspan is about 7.5 mm.
