= Micropterix uxoria =

Scientific classification
- Kingdom: Animalia
- Phylum: Arthropoda
- Clade: Pancrustacea
- Class: Insecta
- Order: Lepidoptera
- Family: Micropterigidae
- Genus: Micropterix
- Species: M. uxoria

Binomial name
- Micropterix uxoria Walsingham, 1919

Synonyms
- Micropteryx uxoria Walsingham, 1919 (misspelling)

Species of moth

Micropterix uxoria is a species of moth belonging to the family Micropterigidae. It was described by Walsingham in 1919 and is endemic to Sicily.
