= Micropterix stuebneri =

Scientific classification
- Kingdom: Animalia
- Phylum: Arthropoda
- Class: Insecta
- Order: Lepidoptera
- Family: Micropterigidae
- Genus: Micropterix
- Species: M. stuebneri

Binomial name
- Micropterix stuebneri Zeller, Werno & Kurz, 2013

Species of moth

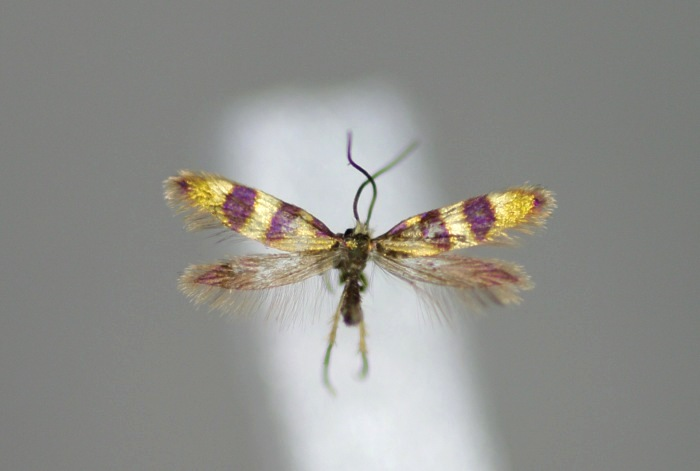

Micropterix stuebneri is a species of moth belonging to the family Micropterigidae. It was described by Zeller, Werno and Kurz in 2013. It is only known from the Sierra Nevada in Spain.

The forewing length is 2.6–3 mm for males and 3.2-3.5 mm for females.
