= Micropterix agenjoi =

Scientific classification
- Kingdom: Animalia
- Phylum: Arthropoda
- Clade: Pancrustacea
- Class: Insecta
- Order: Lepidoptera
- Family: Micropterigidae
- Genus: Micropterix
- Species: M. agenjoi

Binomial name
- Micropterix agenjoi Viette, 1949

Moth species in family Micropterigidae

Micropterix agenjoi is a species of moth belonging to the family Micropterigidae, which was first described by Pierre Viette in 1949.
