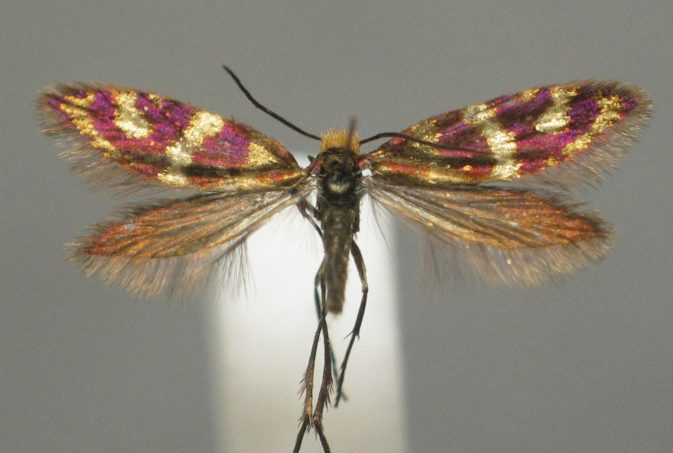

Scientific classification
- Kingdom: Animalia
- Phylum: Arthropoda
- Class: Insecta
- Order: Lepidoptera
- Family: Micropterigidae
- Genus: Micropterix
- Species: M. osthelderi

Binomial name
- Micropterix osthelderi Heath, 1975

= Micropterix osthelderi =

Species of moth

Micropterix osthelderi is a species of moth belonging to the family Micropterigidae. It was described by Heath in 1975. It is known from Italy, Germany, Switzerland, Austria, Poland, the Czech Republic and Denmark.

The habitat consists of mixed coniferous forest especially at montane elevations.

The forewing length is 4.7 mm for males and 5–5.6 mm for females.
