= Micropterix huemeri =

Scientific classification
- Kingdom: Animalia
- Phylum: Arthropoda
- Clade: Pancrustacea
- Class: Insecta
- Order: Lepidoptera
- Family: Micropterigidae
- Genus: Micropterix
- Species: M. huemeri

Binomial name
- Micropterix huemeri Kurz, Kurz & Zeller, 2004

Species of moth

Micropterix huemeri is a species of moth belonging to the family Micropterigidae. It was described by Kurz, Kurz & Zeller in 2004 and is endemic of the geologically isolated region of the Marguareis in France.

Adults have been found in high alpine grassland at elevations higher than 2,000 m in tall herbaceous vegetation around boulders in July.

The forewing length is 3.9 mm for males and 4.4 mm for females.
