= Micropterix turkmeniella =

Scientific classification
- Kingdom: Animalia
- Phylum: Arthropoda
- Class: Insecta
- Order: Lepidoptera
- Family: Micropterigidae
- Genus: Micropterix
- Species: M. turkmeniella

Binomial name
- Micropterix turkmeniella Kuznetsov, 1960

Species of moth

Micropterix turkmeniella is a species of moth belonging to the family Micropterigidae which was described by Vladimir Ivanovitsch Kuznetzov in 1960, and is endemic to Turkmenistan.
