= Micropterix amasiella =

Scientific classification
- Kingdom: Animalia
- Phylum: Arthropoda
- Clade: Pancrustacea
- Class: Insecta
- Order: Lepidoptera
- Family: Micropterigidae
- Genus: Micropterix
- Species: M. amasiella

Binomial name
- Micropterix amasiella Staudinger, 1880

Synonyms
- Microptericina amasiella (Staudinger, 1880)

Species of moth

Micropterix amasiella is a species of moth belonging to the family Micropterigidae that was described by Otto Staudinger in 1880, and is endemic to Turkey.
