= Nannopterix choreutes =

Scientific classification
- Domain: Eukaryota
- Kingdom: Animalia
- Phylum: Arthropoda
- Class: Insecta
- Order: Lepidoptera
- Family: Micropterigidae
- Genus: Nannopterix
- Species: N. choreutes

Binomial name
- Nannopterix choreutes Gibbs, 2010

Species of moth

Nannopterix choreutes is a moth of the family Micropterigidae. It is known from New Caledonia, from the Table Unio south to Rivière Bleue.

The forewing length is 2.4 mm for males.
