= Micropterix algeriella =

Scientific classification
- Kingdom: Animalia
- Phylum: Arthropoda
- Clade: Pancrustacea
- Class: Insecta
- Order: Lepidoptera
- Family: Micropterigidae
- Genus: Micropterix
- Species: M. algeriella

Binomial name
- Micropterix algeriella (Ragonot, 1889)

Synonyms
- Eriocephala algeriella Ragonot, 1889

Species of moth

Micropterix algeriella is a species of moth belonging to the family Micropterigidae. It was described by Émile Louis Ragonot in 1889 and is endemic to Algeria.
