= Micropterix italica =

Scientific classification
- Kingdom: Animalia
- Phylum: Arthropoda
- Clade: Pancrustacea
- Class: Insecta
- Order: Lepidoptera
- Family: Micropterigidae
- Genus: Micropterix
- Species: M. italica

Binomial name
- Micropterix italica Heath, 1981

Species of moth

Micropterix italica is a species of moth belonging to the family Micropterigidae. It was described by Heath in 1981. It is known from Italy.

== Gallery ==
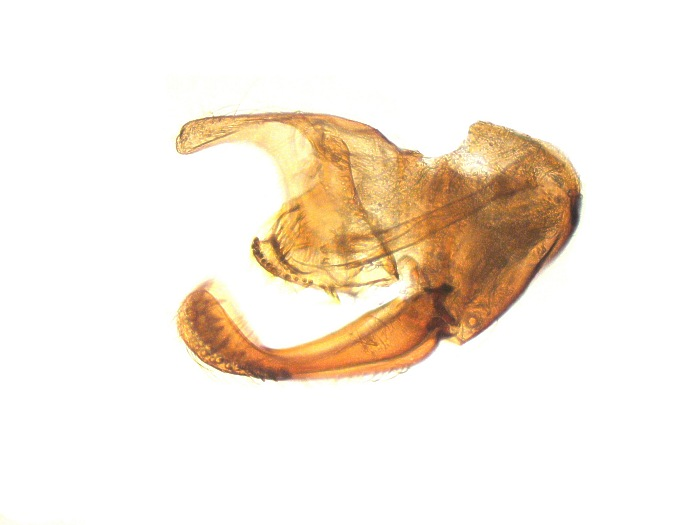
Male genitalia
