= Micropterix maschukella =

Scientific classification
- Kingdom: Animalia
- Phylum: Arthropoda
- Class: Insecta
- Order: Lepidoptera
- Family: Micropterigidae
- Genus: Micropterix
- Species: M. maschukella

Binomial name
- Micropterix maschukella Alphéraky, 1870

Synonyms
- Micropterix maritimella Zagulajev, 1983; Micropterix obliquella Heath (nomen nudum)

Species of moth

Micropterix maschukella is a species of moth belonging to the family Micropterigidae. It was described by Sergei Alphéraky in 1870. It is found in Armenia and the Crimean Peninsula.

The wingspan is 6.8–8 millimetres (0.27–0.31 in) for males and 7.3–9.4 millimetres (0.29–0.37 in) for females.
