= Micropterix monticolella =

Scientific classification
- Kingdom: Animalia
- Phylum: Arthropoda
- Class: Insecta
- Order: Lepidoptera
- Family: Micropterigidae
- Genus: Micropterix
- Species: M. monticolella

Binomial name
- Micropterix monticolella Koslov, 1982

Species of moth

Micropterix monticolella is a species of moth belonging to the family Micropterigidae. It was described by Kozlov, in 1982. It is known from the Caucasus.

The wingspan is about 8.8 mm.
