= Micropterix cyaneochrysa =

Scientific classification
- Kingdom: Animalia
- Phylum: Arthropoda
- Class: Insecta
- Order: Lepidoptera
- Family: Micropterigidae
- Genus: Micropterix
- Species: M. cyaneochrysa

Binomial name
- Micropterix cyaneochrysa Walsingham, 1907

Species of insect

Micropterix cyaneochrysa is a species of moth belonging to the family Micropterigidae that was described by Walsingham, Lord Thomas de Grey, in 1907, and is known from Algeria.
