= Micropterix klimeschi =

Scientific classification
- Kingdom: Animalia
- Phylum: Arthropoda
- Class: Insecta
- Order: Lepidoptera
- Family: Micropterigidae
- Genus: Micropterix
- Species: M. klimeschi

Binomial name
- Micropterix klimeschi Heath, 1973

Species of moth

Micropterix klimeschi is a species of moth belonging to the family Micropterigidae. It was described by Heath in 1973. It is known from Rhodes and Turkey.

The wingspan is 6.3-8.8 mm.

It was reported on Pistacia lentiscus.

== Subspecies ==
- Micropterix klimeschi rhodiensis Kurz, M. A., M. E. Kurz & Zeller, 1993 (Rhodos)
- Micropterix klimeschi klimeschi Heath, 1973 (Dedegöl Dag in Turkey)
