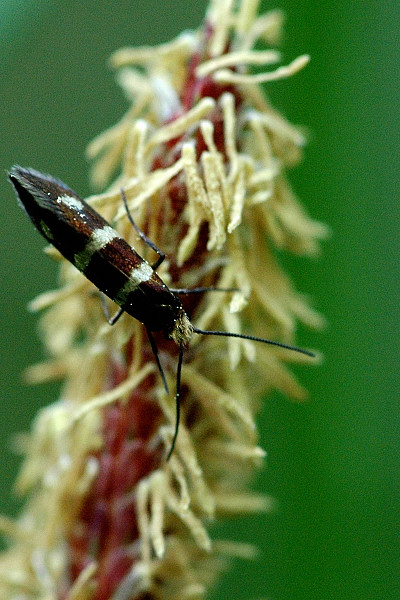

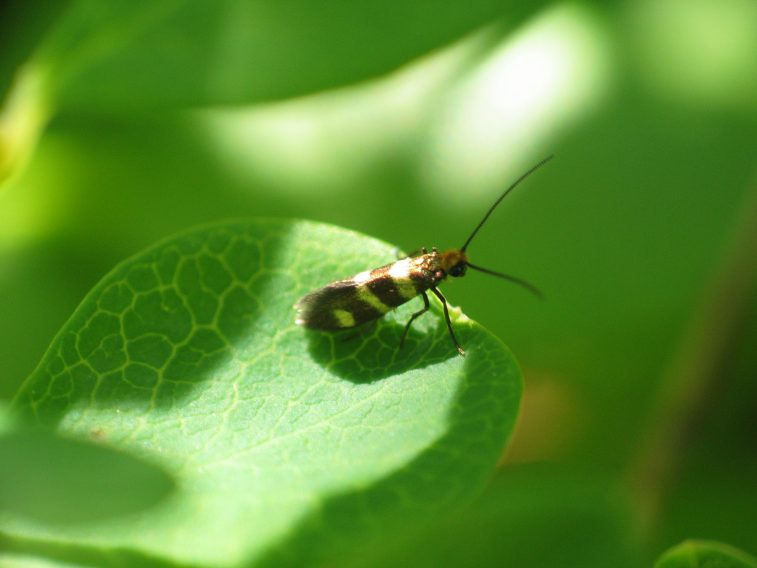

Scientific classification
- Kingdom: Animalia
- Phylum: Arthropoda
- Clade: Pancrustacea
- Class: Insecta
- Order: Lepidoptera
- Family: Micropterigidae
- Genus: Micropterix
- Species: M. aureatella

Binomial name
- Micropterix aureatella (Scopoli, 1763)

Synonyms
- Phalaena aureatella Scopoli, 1763; Tinea paykullella Thunberg, 1794; Tinea ammanella Hübner, 1813; Tinea amanella

= Micropterix aureatella =

Species of moth

Micropterix aureatella is a moth of the family Micropterigidae found in the Palearctic realm (from Europe to Japan), except for North Africa.

== Taxonomy ==
The moth was first described from a specimen found in Carniola, present-day Slovenia, by the Austrian physician and naturalist Giovanni Antonio Scopoli in 1763. He named it Phalaena aureatella. Phalaena – a word used by Aristotle, meaning the rest of the moths; or possibly a devouring monster or whale, which may be derived from the destructive properties of clothes moths; or possibly from phallus an association by the Greeks of lepidoptera and semen which was supposed to attract moths; or paros i.e. a light and the attraction of moths to lights. The moth was later put in the genus Micropterix, which was raised by Jacob Hübner and the name comes from the small size of the adult; Mikros – ″little″ and pterux – ″a wing″. The specific name aureatella – golden from aureatus, referring to the three submetallic markings on the forewing.

=== Subspecies ===
- Micropterix aureatella aureatella
- Micropterix aureatella junctella Weber, 1945
- Micropterix aureatella shikotanica Kozlov, 1988

== Description ==
The wingspan is 9–11 millimetres (0.35–0.43 in). The head is light ferruginous in colour, the forewings shining bronzy-purple with a straight fascia towards base, a rather oblique somewhat bent median fascia, and a spot towards costa posteriorly pale shining golden (forewings with termen always bronzy-purple). Hindwings bronzy-grey, posteriorly purplish-tinged. The adults have working mandibles and feed on the pollen of a variety of flowers, especially those of sedges (Carex species).

Larva

A single larva has been found amongst fungal hyphae in mixed beech, bilberry and oak leaf litter. The larvae are believed to feed on bilberry (Vaccinium species).

Pupa

The pupa is unknown.
