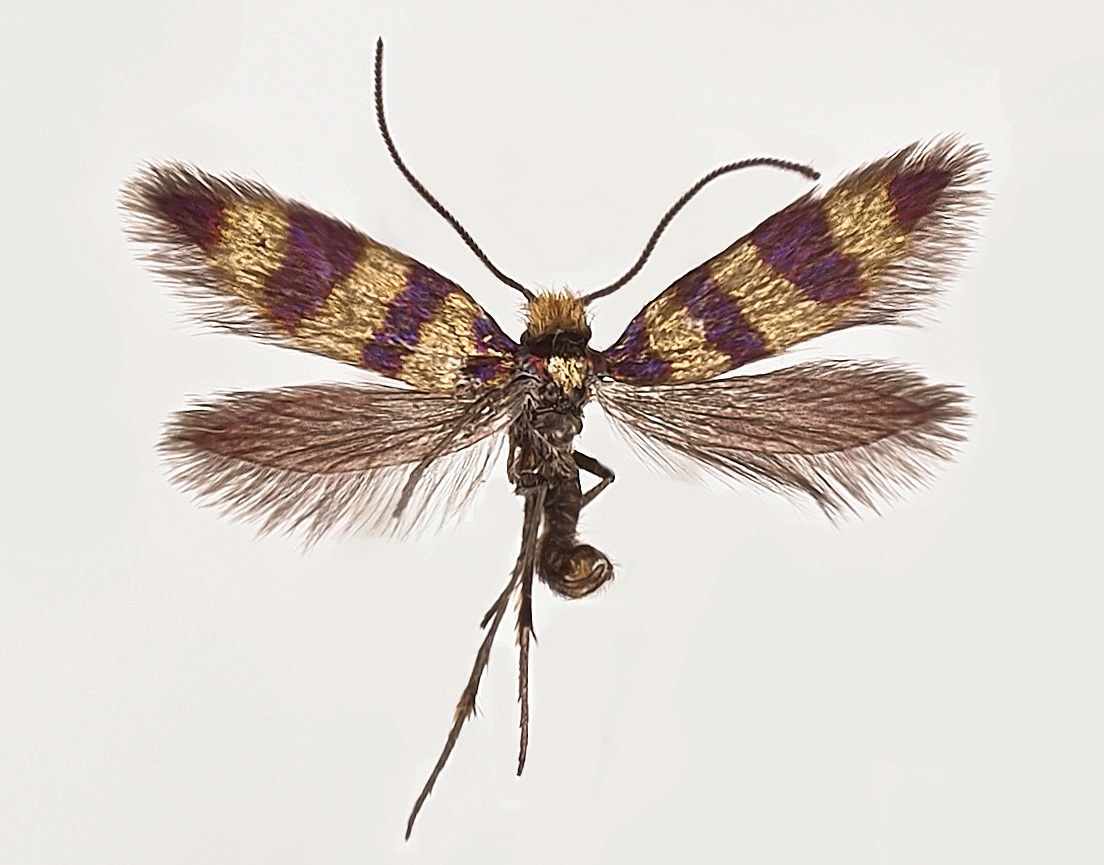
- Male
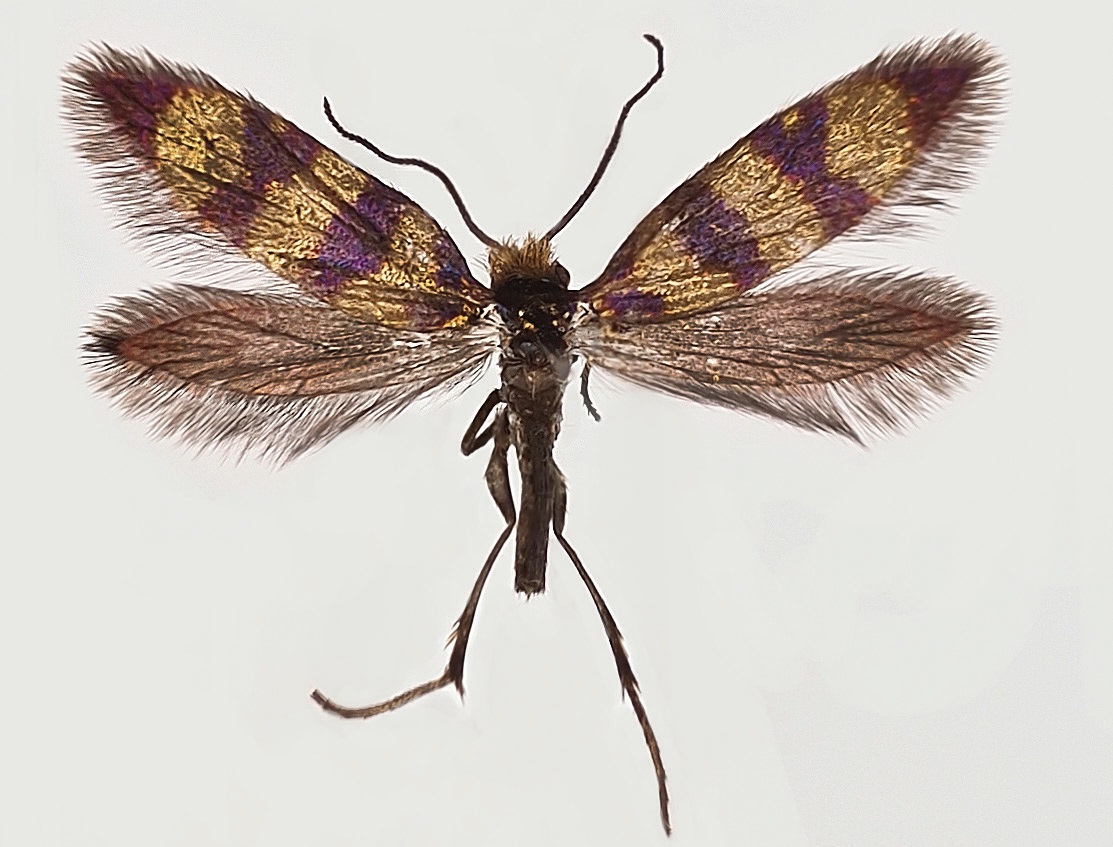
- Female

Scientific classification
- Kingdom: Animalia
- Phylum: Arthropoda
- Clade: Pancrustacea
- Class: Insecta
- Order: Lepidoptera
- Family: Micropterigidae
- Genus: Micropterix
- Species: M. gaudiella

Binomial name
- Micropterix gaudiella Zeller & Huemer, 2015

= Micropterix gaudiella =

Species of moth

Micropterix gaudiella is a species of moth belonging to the family Micropterigidae. It was described by Zeller and Huemer in 2015. It occurs in Italy.

== Etymology ==
The species name is derived from the Latin gaudium (meaning fun, pleasure, happiness). The genus name Micropterix is derived from Greek mikros (little) and pterux (wing).

== Distribution and behaviour ==
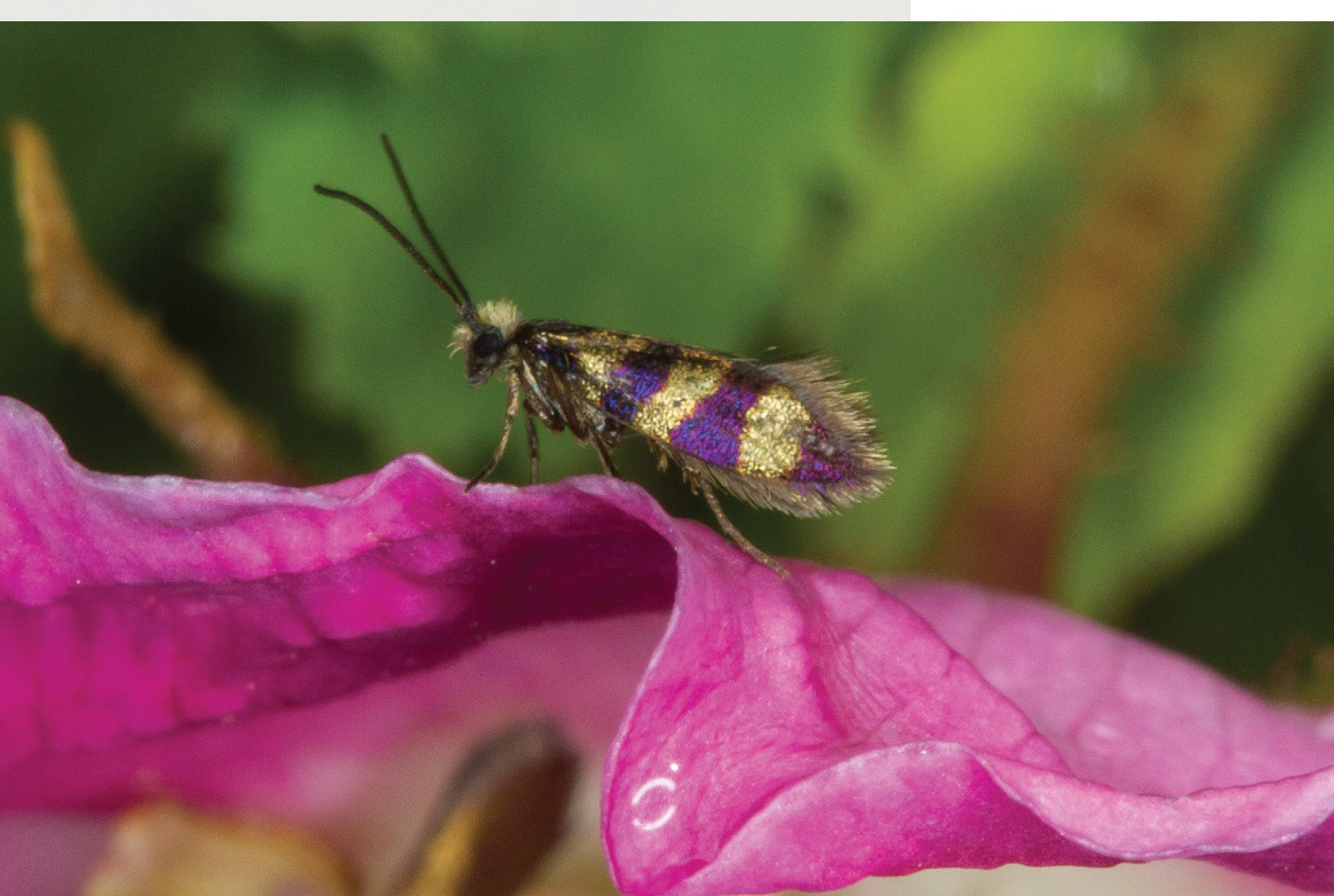
Adult resting on a flower of a Rosa species

The species is known only from the mountain Pizzo Arera in the southern Orobic Alps in Lombardy, Italy, at an elevation of approximately 1,600 meters on south-facing exposed limestone slopes. Adults feed on pollen of Rosa spp. and Helianthemum spp., and have been recorded on wing during late June and early–mid July.

== Description ==
=== Immature stages ===
The immature stages of Micropterix gaudiella have not yet been described.

=== Adults ===
The blueish forewings are strongly marked with three broad bronze-golden bands at 1/4th, 1/2nd and 3/4th of the wing. The first of these is trapeziform; the second is straight and inwardly oblique; and the final band is inwardly convex and variable in shape. The forewing's fringe is bronzy golden, and bluish violet at the base. The hindwings are bronzy golden, with a purplish tinge at the apex. The fringe is bronzy golden.

With a forewing length of 3.5–3.9 mm, male specimens of Micropterix gaudiella are smaller than their female counterparts (4–4.4 mm forewing length).
