= Micropterix minimella =

Scientific classification
- Kingdom: Animalia
- Phylum: Arthropoda
- Class: Insecta
- Order: Lepidoptera
- Family: Micropterigidae
- Genus: Micropterix
- Species: M. minimella

Binomial name
- Micropterix minimella Heath, 1973

Species of moth

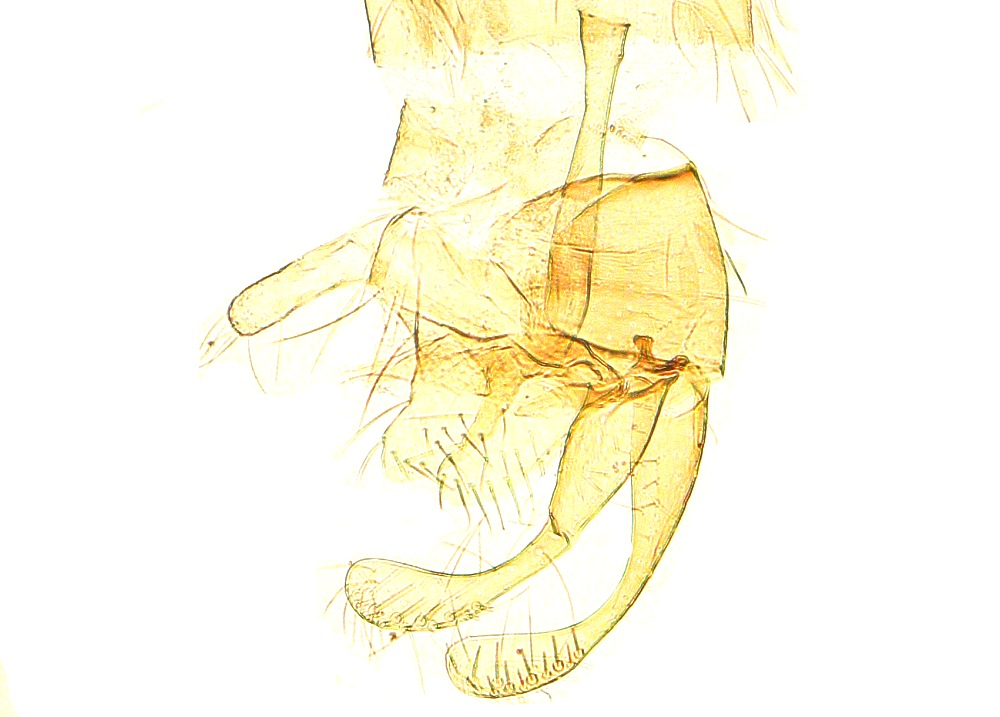
male genitalia of Micropterix minimella

Micropterix minimella is a species of moth belonging to the family Micropterigidae. It was described by Heath in 1973. It is known from Mallorca.

The wingspan is 3.8 mm for males and 3.6 mm for females.

It was found near Brachypodium ramosum.
