= Micropterix completella =

Scientific classification
- Kingdom: Animalia
- Phylum: Arthropoda
- Clade: Pancrustacea
- Class: Insecta
- Order: Lepidoptera
- Family: Micropterigidae
- Genus: Micropterix
- Species: M. completella

Binomial name
- Micropterix completella Staudinger, 1871

Synonyms
- Micropteryx limbarella Amsel, 1936

Moth species in family Micropterigidae

Micropterix completella is a species of moth belonging to the family Micropterigidae, first described by Otto Staudinger in 1871. It is endemic to Italy and is known only from Sardinia.
