= Micropterix longicornuella =

Scientific classification
- Kingdom: Animalia
- Phylum: Arthropoda
- Class: Insecta
- Order: Lepidoptera
- Family: Micropterigidae
- Genus: Micropterix
- Species: M. longicornuella

Binomial name
- Micropterix longicornuella Lees, Rougerie, Zeller & Kristensen, 2010

Species of moth

Micropterix longicornuella is a species of moth belonging to the family Micropterigidae. It was described by Lees, Rougerie, Zeller & Kristensen in 2010. It is only known from the type locality in Darjeeling, West Bengal in northern India.
