= Micropterix herminiella =

Scientific classification
- Kingdom: Animalia
- Phylum: Arthropoda
- Class: Insecta
- Order: Lepidoptera
- Family: Micropterigidae
- Genus: Micropterix
- Species: M. herminiella

Binomial name
- Micropterix herminiella Corley, 2007

Species of moth

Micropterix herminiella is a species of moth belonging to the family Micropterigidae. It was described by Corley in 2007. It is only known from northern Portugal.
