= Micropterix trinacriella =

Scientific classification
- Kingdom: Animalia
- Phylum: Arthropoda
- Clade: Pancrustacea
- Class: Insecta
- Order: Lepidoptera
- Family: Micropterigidae
- Genus: Micropterix
- Species: M. trinacriella

Binomial name
- Micropterix trinacriella M. E. Kurz, Zeller & M. A. Kurz, 1997

Species of moth

Micropterix trinacriella is a species of moth belonging to the family Micropterigidae that was described by Michael A. Kurz, Hans Christof Zeller-Lukashort and Marion E. Kurz in 1997. It is only known from the area near the northern shore of Sicily, as well as in the surrounding of Mount Etna.

The length of the forewings is 2.6–3.1 millimetres (0.10–0.12 in) for males and 2.8–3.6 millimetres (0.11–0.14 in) for females.
