= Micropterix constantinella =

Scientific classification
- Kingdom: Animalia
- Phylum: Arthropoda
- Class: Insecta
- Order: Lepidoptera
- Family: Micropterigidae
- Genus: Micropterix
- Species: M. constantinella

Binomial name
- Micropterix constantinella Heath, 1986

Species of insect

Micropterix constantinella is a species of moth belonging to the family Micropterigidae. It was described by Heath in 1986. It is only known from Algeria, where it has been found near Skikda.
