= Micropterix sicanella =

Scientific classification
- Kingdom: Animalia
- Phylum: Arthropoda
- Class: Insecta
- Order: Lepidoptera
- Family: Micropterigidae
- Genus: Micropterix
- Species: M. sicanella

Binomial name
- Micropterix sicanella Zeller, 1847

Synonyms
- Micropteryx sicanella f. obsoleta Heath, 1963

Species of moth

Micropterix sicanella is a species of moth belonging to the family Micropterigidae that was described by Philipp Christoph Zeller in 1847. It is known from mainland Italy, Sicily, Sardinia and Corsica.

Adults have been found feeding on blossoms of Cistus salviifolius.

The length of the forewings is 3–3.8 millimetres (0.12–0.15 in) for males and 3.7–3.9 millimetres (0.15–0.15 in) for females.
