= Micropterix paykullella =

Scientific classification
- Kingdom: Animalia
- Phylum: Arthropoda
- Class: Insecta
- Order: Lepidoptera
- Family: Micropterigidae
- Genus: Micropterix
- Species: M. paykullella

Binomial name
- Micropterix paykullella (Fabricius, 1794)

Synonyms
- Alucita paykullella Fabricius, 1794; Tinea anderschella Hübner, 1813; Micropterix paykulella f. rosarum Müller-Rutz, 1927; Micropterix anderschella (Hübner, 1813)

Species of moth

Micropterix paykullella is a species of moth belonging to the family Micropterigidae. It was described by Johan Christian Fabricius in 1794. It is distributed locally across the whole Alps, occurring in France, Italy, Austria and Switzerland.

The wingspan is 9–13 mm. Adults are on wing from May to June and fly during the day.

Adults have been found above the timberline (2,200 meters) feeding on pollen of Helianthemum species.
