= Micropterix imperfectella =

Scientific classification
- Kingdom: Animalia
- Phylum: Arthropoda
- Class: Insecta
- Order: Lepidoptera
- Family: Micropterigidae
- Genus: Micropterix
- Species: M. imperfectella

Binomial name
- Micropterix imperfectella Staudinger, 1859

Species of moth

Micropterix imperfectella is a species of moth belonging to the family Micropterigidae. It was described by Staudinger in 1859. It is known from Spain.

The wingspan is 6–8 millimetres (0.24–0.31 in).
