= Micropterix rablensis =

Scientific classification
- Kingdom: Animalia
- Phylum: Arthropoda
- Class: Insecta
- Order: Lepidoptera
- Family: Micropterigidae
- Genus: Micropterix
- Species: M. rablensis

Binomial name
- Micropterix rablensis Zeller, 1868

Species of moth

Micropterix rablensis is a species of moth belonging to the family Micropterigidae, which was described by Philipp Christoph Zeller in 1868. It is probably restricted to Carinthia in Austria and to the adjacent areas of Styria in Austria and Italy and potentially of Slovenia. Its Croatian, Romanian and French existence is doubtful.
