= Micropterix renatae =

Scientific classification
- Kingdom: Animalia
- Phylum: Arthropoda
- Clade: Pancrustacea
- Class: Insecta
- Order: Lepidoptera
- Family: Micropterigidae
- Genus: Micropterix
- Species: M. renatae

Binomial name
- Micropterix renatae Kurz, Kurz & Zeller, 1997

Synonyms
- Micropteryx italica Hartig, 1973; Micropterix italica Hartig, 1973 (Misspelling)

Species of moth

Micropterix renatae is a species of moth belonging to the family Micropterigidae that was described by Michael A. Kurz, Marion E. Kurz and Hans Christof Zeller-Lukashort in 1997. It is known from the Ligurian Alps, as well as the northern Apennine Mountains (the provinces of Liguria, Tuscany and Emilia-Romagna).

The habitat consists of edges of dense, deciduous shrubland and tall herb vegetation.

The length of the forewings is 2.7–3.2 millimetres (0.11–0.13 in) for males and 3.3–3.8 millimetres (0.13–0.15 in) for females.
