= Micropterix lambesiella =

Scientific classification
- Kingdom: Animalia
- Phylum: Arthropoda
- Clade: Pancrustacea
- Class: Insecta
- Order: Lepidoptera
- Family: Micropterigidae
- Genus: Micropterix
- Species: M. lambesiella

Binomial name
- Micropterix lambesiella Viette, 1949

Species of moth

Micropterix lambesiella is a species of moth belonging to the family Micropterigidae. It was described by Viette in 1949. It is known from north-eastern Algeria.

The wingspan is 4.2-4.5 mm.
