= Hypomartyria =

Scientific classification
- Kingdom: Animalia
- Phylum: Arthropoda
- Class: Insecta
- Order: Lepidoptera
- Family: Micropterigidae
- Genus: Hypomartyria; Kristensen & Nielsen, 1982
- Species: H. micropteroides

Binomial name
- Hypomartyria micropteroides Kristensen & Nielsen, 1982

Genus of moths in family Micropterigidae

Hypomartyria is a genus of small primitive metallic moths in the family Micropterigidae. It contains only a single species, Hypomartyria micropteroides. It is known from the Osorno province in Chile.
