= Nannopterix =

Scientific classification
- Domain: Eukaryota
- Kingdom: Animalia
- Phylum: Arthropoda
- Class: Insecta
- Order: Lepidoptera
- Family: Micropterigidae
- Genus: Nannopterix; Gibbs, 2010

Species
- see text.

Genus of moths in family Micropterigidae

Nannopterix is a genus of small primitive metallic moths in the family Micropterigidae.

== Species ==
- Nannopterix choreutes Gibbs, 2010
