= Micropterix elegans =

Scientific classification
- Kingdom: Animalia
- Phylum: Arthropoda
- Class: Insecta
- Order: Lepidoptera
- Family: Micropterigidae
- Genus: Micropterix
- Species: M. elegans

Binomial name
- Micropterix elegans Stainton, 1867

Synonyms
- Micropteryx octopunctella Amsel, 1935

Species of moth

Micropterix elegans is a species of moth belonging to the family Micropterigidae that was described by Stainton in 1867, and is endemic to Israel.
