= Terncladus =

Terncladus Temporal range: late Cretaceous

Scientific classification
- Kingdom: Animalia
- Phylum: Arthropoda
- Class: Insecta
- Order: Lepidoptera
- Family: Micropterigidae
- Genus: †Terncladus; Han, Zhang and Ren, 2024

Extinct genus of moths

Terncladus (meaning "three branched") is an extinct genus of lepidopteran that belongs to the taxonomic family Micropterigidae. This genus has two species discovered, they are Terncladus luntus and Terncladus holonatus.

The genus lived during the late Cretaceous period in northern Myanmar.
