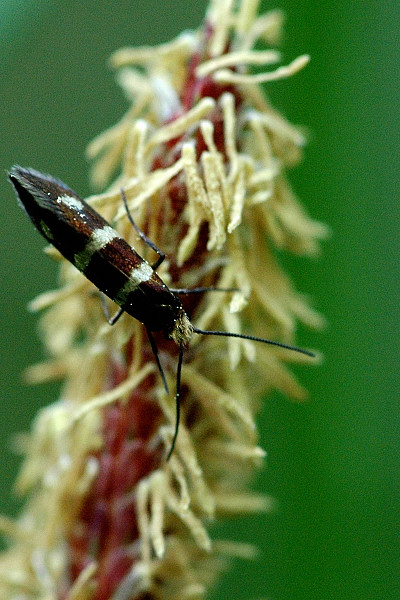
- Micropterix aureatella (Scopoli, 1763)

Scientific classification
- Kingdom: Animalia
- Phylum: Arthropoda
- Clade: Pancrustacea
- Class: Insecta
- Order: Lepidoptera
- Family: Micropterigidae
- Genus: Micropterix; Hübner, 1825

Species
- See text

Synonyms
- Micropteryx Zeller, 1839; Eriocephala Curtis, 1839; Microptericina Zagulajev, 1983

= Micropterix =

Genus of moths

Micropterix is a genus of small primitive metallic moths, in the family Micropterigidae within the insect order Lepidoptera. The genus was created by the German entomologist Jacob Hübner in 1825 and the name comes from the Greek words mikros, meaning "little" and pterux, meaning "wing". The moths are distributed across Europe, south to North Africa and east as far as Japan.

== Description ==
The moths are small, with the forewing ranging in size from 2.5 mm to 5.5 mm, and at rest they are held at a steep angle, tent-like over the body. Members of the family to which this genus belongs are unique among the Lepidoptera in having chewing mouthparts rather than a proboscis. They are often seen feeding, often in large aggregations, on the pollen of the flowers of many herbaceous plants, shrubs and trees. Eggs are translucent white and laid amongst vegetation on the surface of the soil. The life history of the early stages is more or less unknown but larva have been found in the young shoots of plants, or obtained by the funnel extraction of woodland turf samples, from a depth of up to 10 cm (3.9 in). It appears there are only three instars and they probably feed on minute particles of leaf-litter or possibly fungal hyphae. For many species the pupa is unknown, but of those found it is within a tough silken cocoon.

Edward Meyrick describes the moths as:

Mandibles developed. No tongue. Labial palpi obsolete. Posterior tibiae with spurs placed in groups of bristles. Forewings: vein 7 to costa, vein 11 connected by bar with vein 12, 12 giving rise to an additional vein (13) about middle. Hindwings as forewings, but vein 13 usually absent.

== Species ==
Micropterix contains the following species:

- Micropterix abchasiae
- Micropterix agenjoi
- Micropterix aglaella
- Micropterix algeriella
- Micropterix allionella
- Micropterix amasiella
- Micropterix amsella
- †Micropterix anglica
- Micropterix aruncella
- Micropterix aureatella
- Micropterix aureocapilla
- Micropterix aureofasciella
- Micropterix aureopennella
- Micropterix aureoviridella
- Micropterix avarcella
- Micropterix balcanica Heath (manuscript name)
- Micropterix berytella
- Micropterix calthella
- Micropterix carthaginiensis
- Micropterix cassinella
- Micropterix completella
- Micropterix conjunctella
- Micropterix constantinella
- Micropterix corcyrella
- Micropterix cornuella
- Micropterix croatica
- Micropterix cyaneochrysa
- Micropterix cypriensis
- Micropterix eatoniella
- Micropterix elegans
- Micropterix emiliensis
- Micropterix erctella
- Micropterix facetella
- Micropterix fasciata Heath (manuscript name)
- Micropterix fenestrellensis
- Micropterix garganoensis
- Micropterix gaudiella
- †Micropterix gertraudae
- Micropterix granatensis
- Micropterix hartigi
- Micropterix herminiella
- Micropterix huemeri
- Micropterix hyrcana
- Micropterix ibericella
- Micropterix igaloensis
- †Micropterix immensipalpa
- Micropterix imperfectella
- Micropterix inornatus Heath (manuscript name)
- Micropterix islamella
- Micropterix isobasella
- Micropterix italica
- Micropterix jabalmoussae
- Micropterix jacobella
- (Micropterix jeanneli) (either treated as a synonym or valid species)
- Micropterix kardamylensis
- Micropterix klimeschi
- Micropterix lagodechiella
- Micropterix lakoniensis
- Micropterix lambesiella
- Micropterix longicornuella
- Micropterix mansuetella
- Micropterix maschukella
- Micropterix minimella
- Micropterix montanella
- Micropterix monticolella
- Micropterix montosiella
- Micropterix myrtetella
- Micropterix osthelderi
- Micropterix paykullella
- Micropterix purpureopennella
- Micropterix rablensis
- Micropterix renatae
- Micropterix rothenbachii
- Micropterix schaefferi
- Micropterix sicanella
- Micropterix sikhotealinensis
- Micropterix staudinger Heath (manuscript name)
- Micropterix stuebneri
- Micropterix trifasciella
- Micropterix trinacriella
- Micropterix tunbergella
- Micropterix turkmeniella
- Micropterix tuscaniensis
- Micropterix uxoria
- Micropterix vulturensis
- Micropterix wockei
- Micropterix zangheriella
