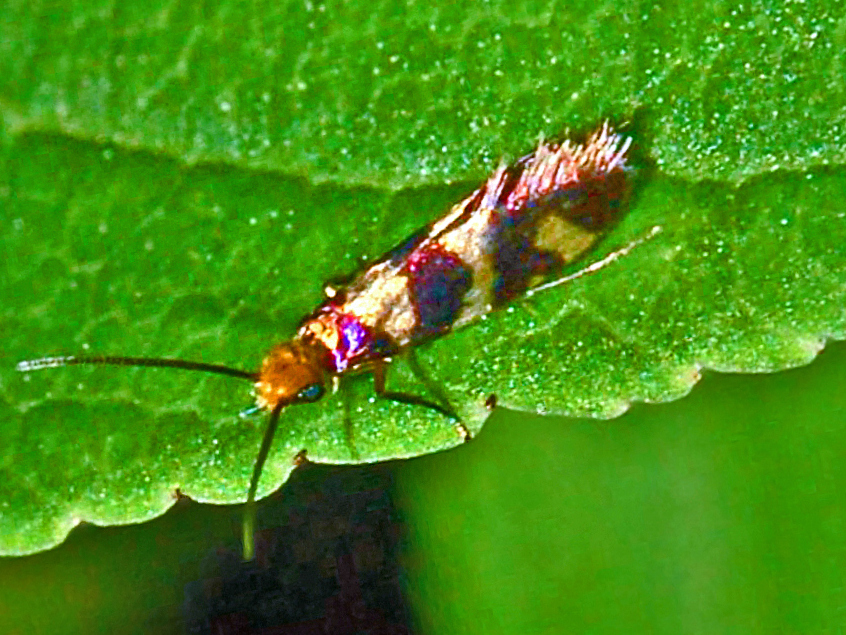
- Micropterix cf. rothenbachii

Scientific classification
- Kingdom: Animalia
- Phylum: Arthropoda
- Class: Insecta
- Order: Lepidoptera
- Family: Micropterigidae
- Genus: Micropterix
- Species: M. rothenbachii

Binomial name
- Micropterix rothenbachii Frey, 1856

Synonyms
- Micropteryx rothenbachii Frey, 1856; Micropterix australis Heath, 1981; Micropterix vallebonnella Réal, 1988

= Micropterix rothenbachii =

Species of moth

Micropterix rothenbachii is a species of moth belonging to the family Micropterigidae that was described by Heinrich Frey in 1856. It is known from Italy, Sicily, Austria, France, Switzerland, Germany, Croatia and Slovenia.

The forewing length is 3.6–4.6 millimetres (0.14–0.18 in) for males and 4.5–5 millimetres (0.18–0.20 in) for females.

== Imagines ==
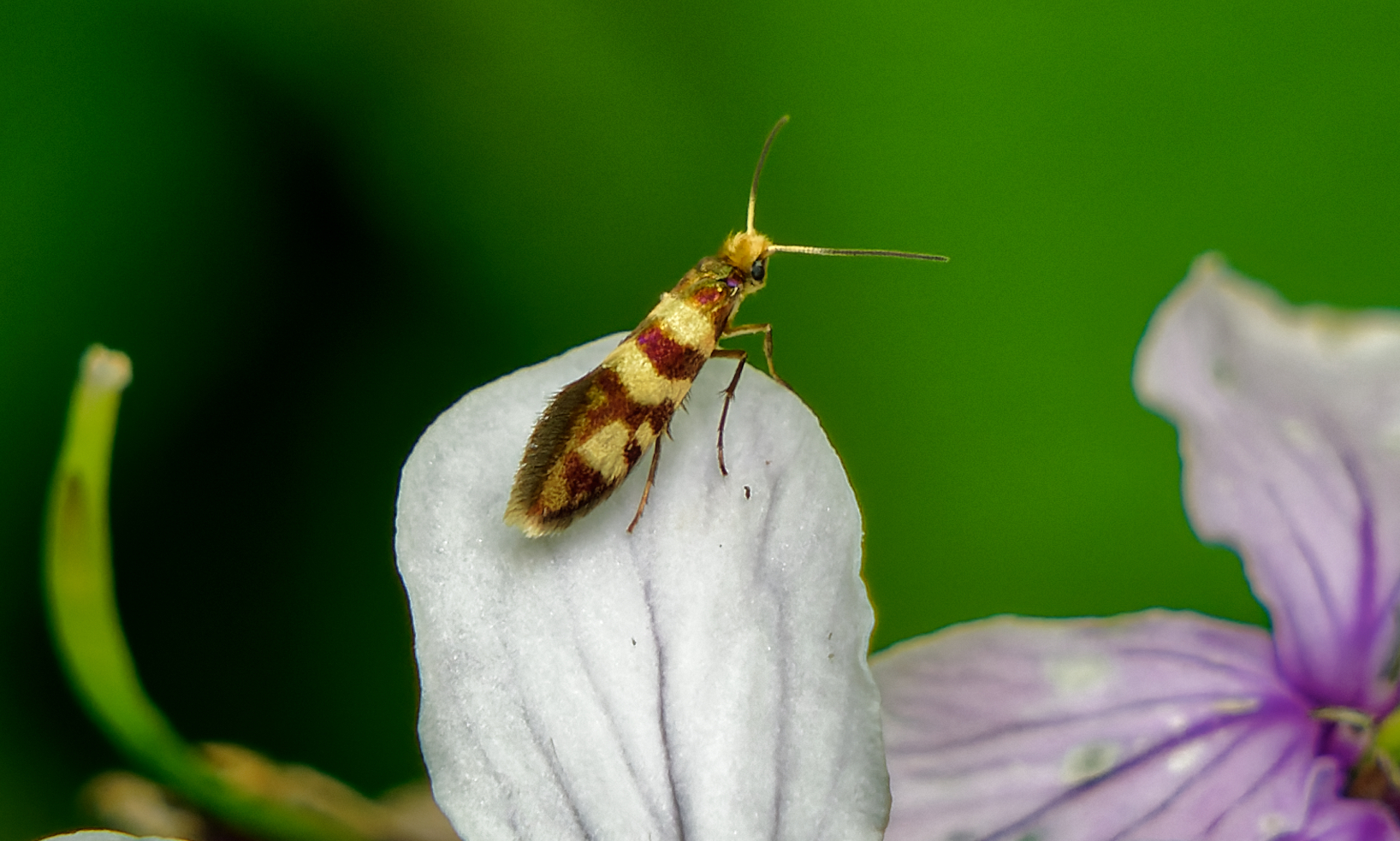
Germany, Suebian Jura Micropterix rothenbachii

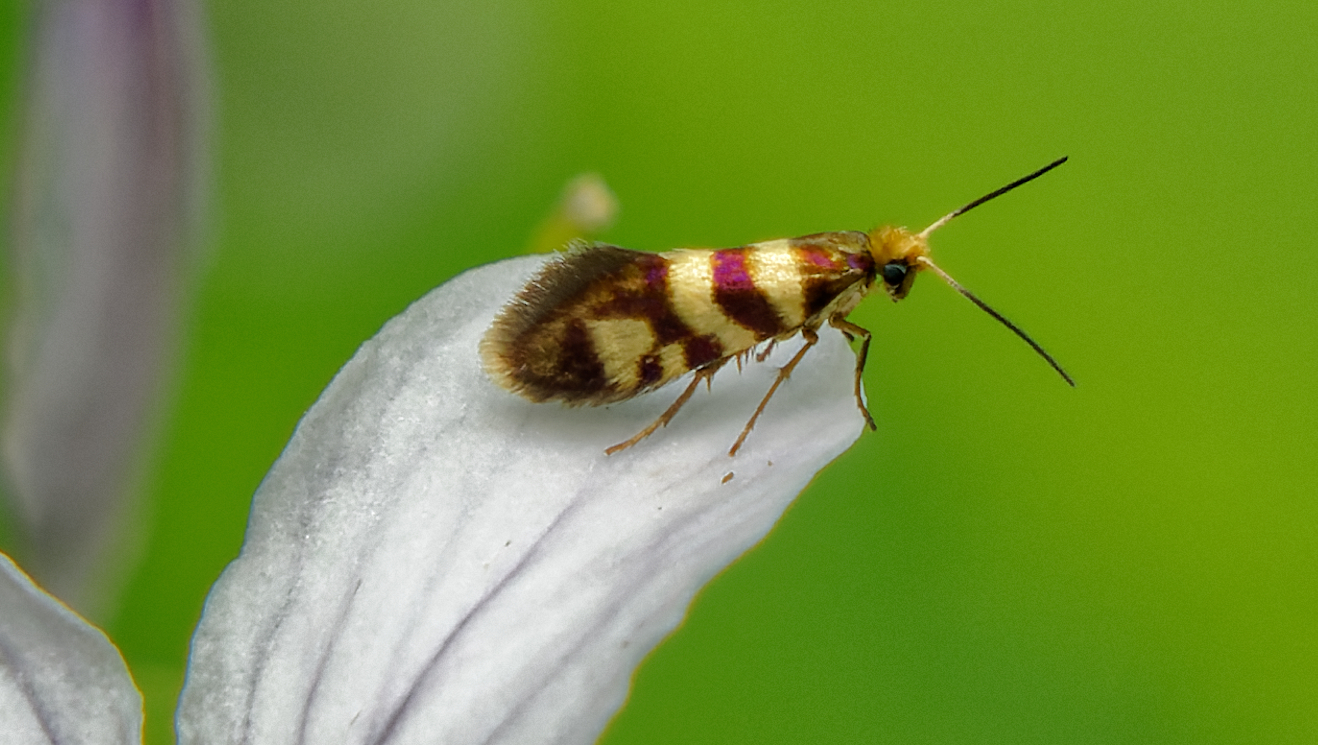
Germany, Suebian Jura Micropterix rothenbachii
