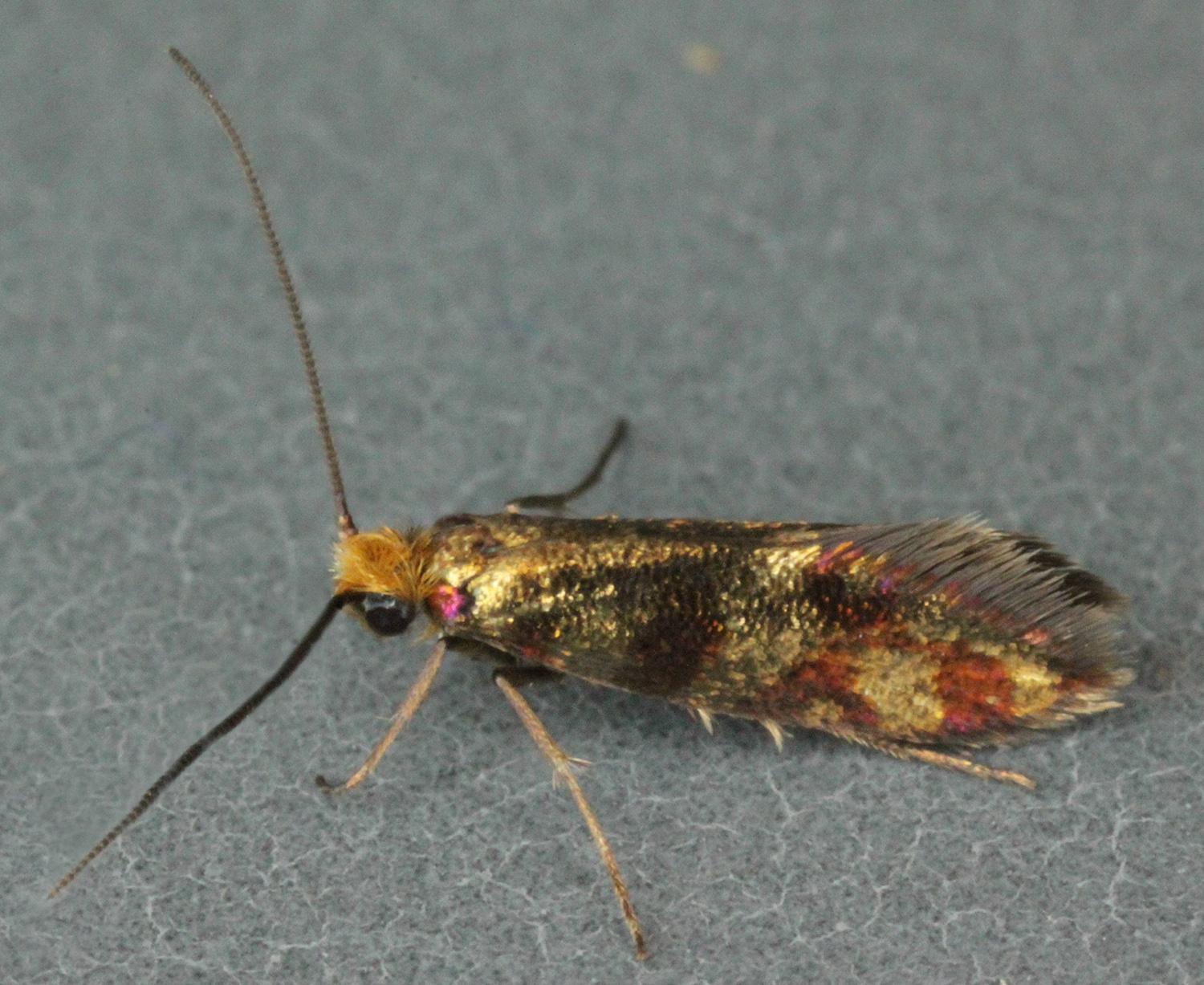
- Micropterix tunbergella, Loggerheads, North Wales

Scientific classification
- Kingdom: Animalia
- Phylum: Arthropoda
- Class: Insecta
- Order: Lepidoptera
- Family: Micropterigidae
- Genus: Micropterix
- Species: M. tunbergella

Binomial name
- Micropterix tunbergella (Fabricius, 1787)

Synonyms
- List: Tinea tunbergella Fabricius, 1787; Tinea helwigella Hübner, 1805; Tinea rubrifasciella Haworth, 1828; Micropteryx depictella Herrich-Schäffer, 1851

= Micropterix tunbergella =

Species of moth

Micropterix tunbergella is a moth of the family Micropterigidae found in most of Europe. The moths are very small and can be found feeding on the pollen of hawthorn, oak and sycamore. The larva and pupa are unknown. The moth was described Johan Christian Fabricius in 1787.

== Taxonomy ==
The moth was first described from a specimen found in Germany, by the Danish zoologist, Johan Christian Fabricius in 1787. He named it Tinea tunbergella. Tinea – a ″gnawing worm″, was first used by the father of modern taxonomy Carl Linnaeus, in his Systema Naturae published in 1758 and was applied to various larvae, including those Lepidoptera which ruined clothing. Micropterix was raised by Jacob Hübner and the name comes from the small size of the adult; Mikros – ″little″ and pterux – ″a wing″. The specific part of the name tunbergella is after the Swedish naturalist Carl Peter Thunberg (1743–1828).

== Description ==
The wingspan is 8–11 millimetres (0.31–0.43 in). The forewing is reddish-purple with indistinct dull golden markings present in the apical third of the forewing. The head is golden-yellow. Moths in the family Micropterigidae are different from other moths, as they have chewing mouthparts, and this species is on wing during the day in May and June feeding on the pollen of various flowering plants, including cherry laurel, oaks (Quercus species), sycamore (Acer pseudoplatanus) and hawthorns (Crataegus) species.

The larva, their food plant(s) and the pupa are not known.

== Distribution ==
It is found in most of Europe, except Bulgaria, Croatia, Finland, Ireland, Italy, Luxembourg Portugal, Slovenia and Ukraine.
