= Aleksei Konstantinovich Zagulyaev =

Russian entomologist

- Алексей Констанович Загуляев
- Born: 6 October 1924; Melekess
- Died: 2007 (aged 82–83); Saint Petersburg
- Occupation: Entomologist
- Known for: Tineidae

Aleksei Konstantinovich Zagulyaev (Russian: Алексей Констанович Загуляев; 6 October 1924 – 24 May 2007), often spelled as Zagulajev, was a Russian entomologist. He was specialized in Tineidae.

== Works ==
His work include (incomplete list):

- ZAGULAJEV, A. K., 1954.– O biologii platjanoj moli (Tineola bisselliella Humm.) i novogo vida - mebel‘noj moli (Tineola furciferella Zagulajev, sp. n.).– Trudy˘ Zoologicheskogo instituta AN SSSR, 15: 154-169, 5 figs.
- ZAGULAJEV, A. K., 1955.– Rod Monopis Hb. (Lepidoptera, Tineidae) i jego novyje vidy [genus Monopis Hb. (Lepidoptera, Tineidae) and their new species].– Trudy˘ Zoologicheskogo instituta, 21: 278-291, 4 figs.
- ZAGULAJEV, A. K., 1956a.– Podrod Acedes Hb. (Lepidoptera, Tineidae) i jego novyje vidy. [Revision of subgenus Acedes Hb. (Lepidoptera, Tineidae) with descriptions of new species].– Entomologicheskoe obozrenie, 35(1): 154-158, 5 figs.
- ZAGULAJEV, A. K., 1956b.– Novyj rod nastojashchich molej Cilicorneola Zagulajev gen. n. (Lepidoptera, Tineidae). [Cilicorneola, gen. n., eine neue paläarktische Tineiden-Gattung].– Entomologicheskoe obozrenie, 35(4): 912-926, 19 figs.
- ZAGULAJEV, A. K., 1960.– Nastojashchije moli (Tineidae), Podsemejstvo Tineinae. In Fauna SSSR, N. S. Nasekomyje, Cheshujekrylyje 78, 4(3): 1-267, 231 figs. Moskva, Leningrad.
- ZAGULAJEV, A. K., 1961a.– Nekotoryje vidy gribnych molej roda Neurothaumasia Le March. (Lepidoptera, Tineidae, Nemapogoninae). [Certain species of fungivorous moths of the genus Neurothaumasia Le March. (Lepidoptera, Tineidae, Nemapogoninae)].– Entomologicheskoe obozrenie, 40(1): 214-224, 15 figs.
- ZAGULAJEV, A. K., 1961b.– Novyje vidy gribnych molej roda Nemapogon Schr. (Lepidoptera, Tineidae). [New species of fungous moths of the genus Nemapogon Schr. (Lepidoptera, Tineidae)].– Zoologichesky Zhurnal, 40(8): 1184-1191, 7 figs.
- ZAGULAJEV, A. K., 1961c.– Nastojashchije moli fauny Tadzhikistana (Lepidoptera, Tineidae). I. Sobstvenno moli (Tineinae). [The tineid moths of Tadzhikistan (Lepidoptera, Tineidae). I. True moths (Tineinae)].– Trudy˘ Instituta Zoologii i Parazitologii im. E. N. Pavlovskogo AN Tadzhikskoj SSR, 20: 155-168, 5 figs.
- ZAGULAJEV, A. K., 1962.– Novyj rod gribnych molej (Lepidoptera, Tineidae, Nemapogoninae). [A new genus of fungous moths (Lepidoptera, Tineidae, Nemapogoninae)].– Trudy˘ Zoologicheskogo Instituta Akademii Nauk SSSR, 30: 330-336, 8 figs.
- ZAGULAJEV, A. K., 1964.– Nastojashchije Moli (Tineidae), Podsemejstvo Nemapogoninae.– In: Fauna SSSR, N. S. 86: Nasekomyje, Cheshujekrylyje, 4(2): 1-424, 385 figs. Moskva, Leningrad.
- ZAGULAJEV, A. K., 1963. On the new genus Anemapogon Zagulajaev, gen. n. and its new species (Lepidoptera, Tineinae, Nemapogoninae). Entomol Oboz 42:425–435 (in Russian)
- Zagulajev, A.K, 1965. Moths and Pyralid moths ‒ pests of grain and food supplies. Moscow. Leningrad. Nauka 1‒273
- ZAGULAJEV, A. K., 1965.– Nastojashchije moli fauny Tadzhikistana (Lepidoptera, Tineidae). I. Sobstvenno moli, ili keratofagi (Tineinae). [The tineid moths of Tadzhikistan (Lepidoptera, Tineidae). True moths, ceratophagous moths (Tineinae)].– Izvestija otdelenija biologicheskich nauk AN Tadzhikskoj SSR, 3(20): 55-68, 8 figs.
- ZAGULAJEV, A. K., 1966. Novyje vidy molej iz semejstv Tineidae i Ochsenheimeriidae (Lepidoptera). [New species of the moths of the families Tineidae and Ochsenheimeriidae (Lepidoptera)].– Trudy Zoologicheskogo Instituta Akademii Nauk SSSR, 37: 148-176
- ZAGULAJEV, A.K., 1966. The subfamily Scardiinae (Lep., Tineidae)and its new species. Entomologischeskoe Obozrenie 45,634–644. (In Russian.)
- ZAGULAJEV, A. K., 1968.– Nastojashchije moli fauny Tadzhikistana (Lepidoptera, Tineidae). 2. Gribnyje moli (Nemapogoninae). [The tineid moths of Tadzhikistan (Lepidoptera, Tineidae). 2. Fungus moths (Nemapogoninae)].– Izvestija otdelenija biologicheskich nauk AN Tadzhikskoj SSR, 3(32): 26-41, 9 figs.
- ZAGULAJEV, A. K., 1971.– Biologicheskaja charakteristika molej podsem. Myrmecozelinae (Lepidoptera, Tineidae) i opisanije novych ich vidov. [Biological characteristics of moths of the subfamily Myrmecozelinae (Lepidoptera, Tineidae) and the description of new species.– Entomologicheskoe obozrenie, 50(2): 416-425, 10 figs.
- ZAGULAJEV, A. K., 1973.– Nasekomyje, Cheshujekrylyje. Nastojashchije Moli (Tineidae), Podsemejstvo Scardiinae.– In Fauna SSSR. - Izdatel’stvo Nauka, Leningradskoje otdelenije, Leningrad, 4(4): 1-127, 99 figs.
- ZAGULAJEV, A.K., 1973. Tineidae; part 4-subfamily Scardiinae.Fauna SSSR 104,1–126. (In Russian)
- ZAGULAJEV, A. K., 1974.– Novyje i maloizvestnyje vidy nastojashchich molej (Lepidoptera, Tineidae). [New and little known species of true moths (Lepidoptera, Tineidae].– Entomologicheskoje obozrenije, 53(2): 410-426, 17 figs.
- ZAGULAJEV, A. K., 1975.– Nastojashchije Moli (Tineidae), Podsemejstvo Myrmecozelinae. In: Fauna SSSR, N. S. 108. Nasekomyje, Cheschujekrylyje - Leningrad, 4(5): 1-428, 319 figs.
- ZAGULAJEV, A. K., 1979.– Nastojashchije moli (Tineidae). Podsemejstvo Meessiinae.– Fauna SSSR, N. S. 119, Leningrad, 4(6): 1-408, 332 figs.
- ZAGULAJEV, A. K., 1983.– Novyje i maloizvestnyje vidy molevidnych cheshujekrylych (Lepidoptera: Tineidae, Micropterigidae, Pterophoridae) fauny SSSR i sopredel’nych territorii. [New and little known species of the moths (Lepidoptera: Tineidae, Micropterigidae, Pterophoridae) from the USSR and adjacent territories].– Entomologicheskoje obozrenije, 62(1): 106-122, 21 figs.
- Zagulajev, A.L., 1988. Clothes moths (Tineidae), part 5 (Myrmecozeliae). Fauna of the USSR 4 (5):1-588.
- ZAGULAJEV, A. K., 1992.– Novyje i maloizvestnyje vidy molevidnych cheshujekrylych (Lepidoptera: Incurvariidae, Tineidae, Psychidae, Alucitidae) fauny SSSR. V. [New and little known Microlepidoptera (Lepidoptera: Incurvariidae, Tineidae, Psychidae, Alucitidae) of the fauna of the USSR. V.].– Entomologitscheskoje obozrenije, 71(1): 105-120, 11 figs.
- Zagulajev, A.K., 1993. New species of the Microlepidoptera (Lepidoptera: Micropterigidae, Tineidae, Psychidae) of the fauna of Russia and neighbouring territories. VI. Entomologicheskoje obozrenije, 72 (1), 119–133. [in Russian]
- ZAGULAJEV, A. K., 2002.– Novyje i maloizvestnyje vidy molevidnych cheshujekrylych (Lepidoptera: Tineidae, Psychidae, Pterophoridae) fauny Rossii i sopredel’nych territorii. XIII [New and little known species of moths (Lepidoptera: Tineidae, Psychidae, Pterophoridae) of the fauna of Russia and neighbouring territories XIII].– Entomologicheskoje obozrenije, 81(2): 356-369, 9 figs.
