= John Heath (entomologist) =

English entomologist

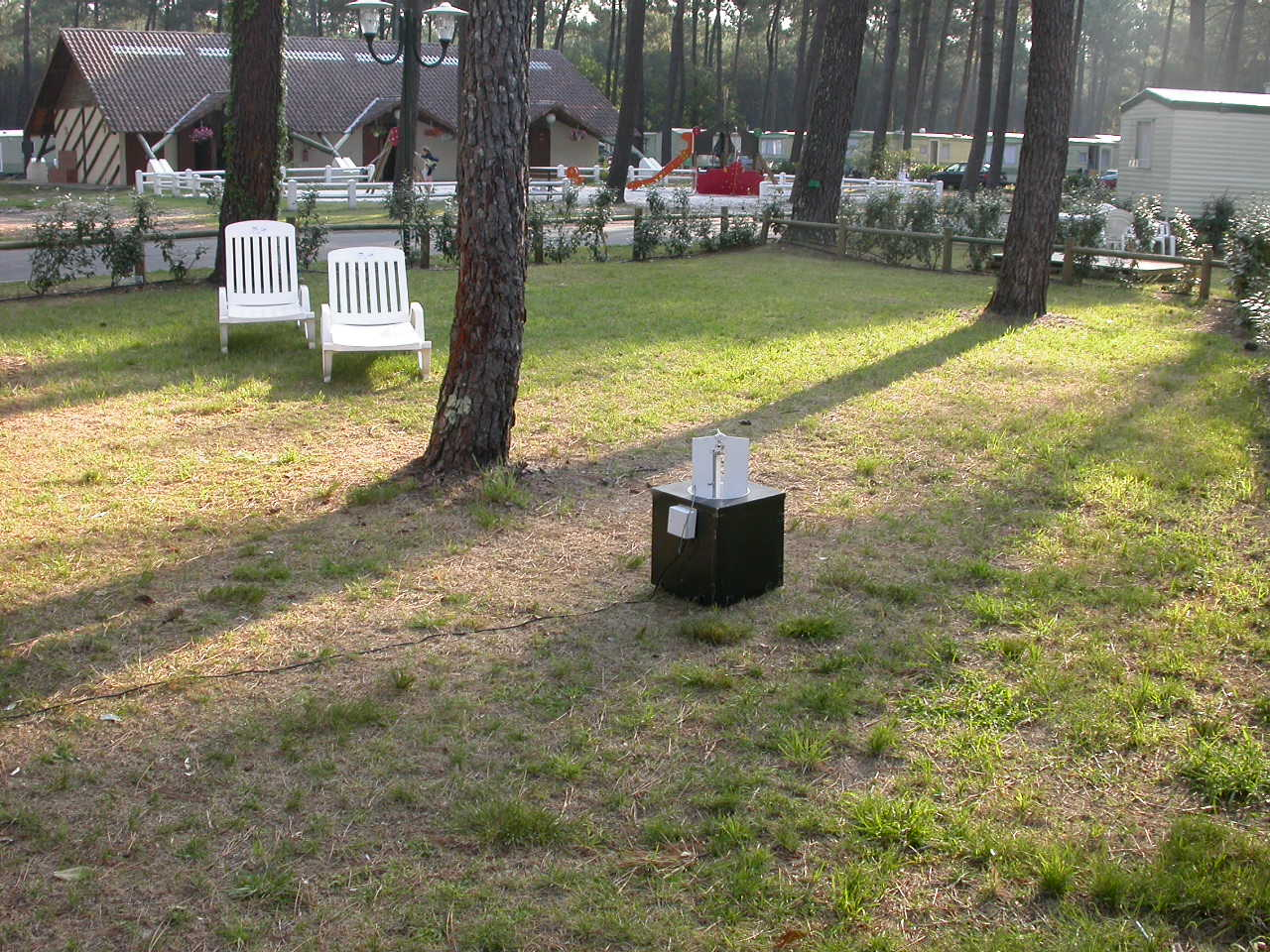
- Heath trap
- Born: 18 January 1922; Worcester, England
- Died: 6 July 1987 (aged 65)
- Citizenship: British
- Education: King Edward VI School, Southampton
- Known for: Editor of The Moths and Butterflies of Great Britain and Ireland; Established data banks as a tool for conservation policy The Heath trap
- Scientific career
- Fields: Lepidopterology
- Workplaces: Merlewood Research Station (Nature Conservancy); Monks Wood Experimental Station

John Heath (18 January 1922 – 6 July 1987) FRES was an English entomologist, specialising in lepidoptera. He helped to established data banks as a tool for conservation policy, both at a national and local level; was chief editor of The Moths and Butterflies of Great Britain and Ireland; and helped to develop the Heath Trap, a portable moth light used for recording moths at light.

== Personal life ==
Born in Worcester on 18 January 1922, his father Frederick Heath had been an officer in the Indian Army, who had taken a teaching job in Southampton and became the head of an elementary school in Winchester. John attended King Edward VI School, Southampton. His interest in entomology developed as a youth spent in and around the Hamble estuary, Hampshire. An intention to go to Cambridge to study electronics did not happen because of army service during the Second World War. While employed by the Nature Conservancy at Merlewood he married Joan Broomfield in 1955; their son was born a year later.

== Career ==
Following service in the army during the war, Heath was employed by the Biological Research Department of Pest Control, near Cambridge from 1947 – 1952. In 1953 Heath joined the Nature Conservancy and was based at the Merlewood Research Station in Cumbria (at that time part of Lancashire). In 1967 Heath moved to Monkswood Experimental Research Station where he worked until his retirement in 1982 where he was head of the Biological Records Centre.

Heath described the now eponymous portable trap in 1965.

A founder member and vice-president of the Society of European Lepidopterology, Heath was particularly interested in the Micropterigidae and bequeathed his specimen collection to the Natural History Museum, London. John Heath was chief editor of the Moths and Butterflies of Great Britain and Ireland series, published by Harley Books.
