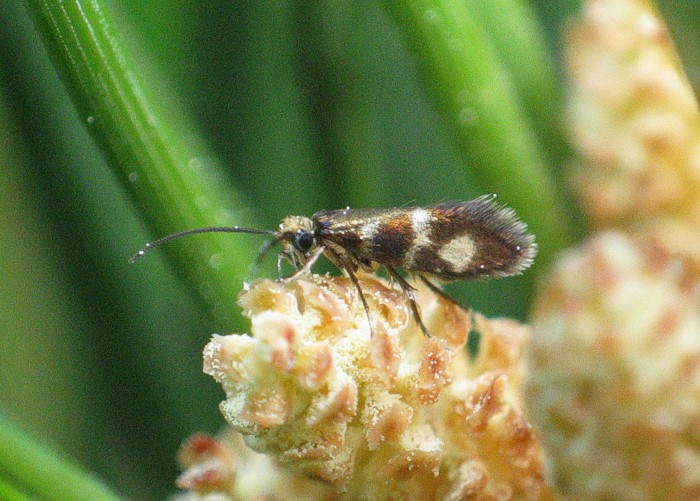
- Micropterix aureoviridella (Höfner, 1898)

Scientific classification
- Kingdom: Animalia
- Phylum: Arthropoda
- Class: Insecta
- Order: Lepidoptera
- Suborder: Zeugloptera; Chapman, 1917
- Superfamily: Micropterigoidea; Herrich-Schäffer, 1855
- Family: Micropterigidae; Herrich-Schäffer, 1855

Genera
- See text

Diversity
- About 180 species

= Micropterigidae =

Micropterigidae Temporal range: Middle Jurassic–Present

Family of primitive moths

Micropterigoidea is the superfamily of "mandibulate archaic moths", all placed in the single family Micropterigidae, containing currently about twenty living genera. They are considered the most primitive extant lineage of lepidoptera (Kristensen, 1999), and the sole superfamily in the suborder Zeugloptera. The name comes from the Greek for mikros, little and pterux, a wing. Unique among the Lepidoptera, these moths have chewing mouthparts rather than a proboscis, and are seen feeding, often in large aggregations, on the pollen of the flowers of many herbaceous plants, shrubs and trees. The fossil record of the group goes back to the middle-late Jurassic with the earliest known species being Auliepterix from the Karabastau Formation in Kazakhstan.

Micropterigid larvae possess a uniquely specialised trunk cuticle, in which the exo- and endocuticle are separated by fluid-filled chambers arranged in a honeycomb pattern, each chamber corresponding to an individual epidermal cell.

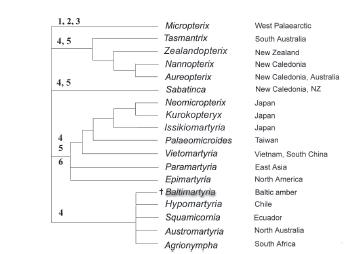
Presumed phylogenetic relationships within Micropterigidae based on Gibbs (2010)

== Genera ==
- Micropterix Hübner, 1825
- Epimartyria Walsingham, 1898
- Issikiomartyria Hashimoto, 2006
- Kurokopteryx Hashimoto, 2006
- Neomicropteryx Issiki, 1931
- Palaeomicroides Issiki, 1931
- Paramartyria Issiki, 1931
- Vietomartyria Mey, 1997
- Sabatinca Walker, 1863
- Agrionympha Meyrick, 1921
- Hypomartyria Kristensen & Nielsen 1982
- Squamicornia Kristensen & Nielsen, 1982
- Austromartyria Gibbs, 2010
- Tasmantrix Gibbs, 2010
- Zealandopterix Gibbs, 2010
- Aureopterix Gibbs, 2010
- Nannopterix Gibbs, 2010

=== Extinct genera ===
- † Archmosaicus Zhang, Deng et Ren, 2020 Burmese amber, Myanmar, Cenomanian
- † Auliepterix Kozlov, 1989 Karabastau Formation, Kazakhstan, Callovian/Oxfordian Hotont Formation, Mongolia, Aptian
- † Baltimartyria Skalski, 1995 Baltic amber, Eocene
- † Electrocrania Kuznetsov 1941 Baltic amber, Eocene
- † Moleropterix Engel & Kinzelbach, 2008 Fur Formation, Denmark, Ypresian
- † Palaeosabatinca Kozlov, 1989 Zaza Formation, Russia, Aptian
- † Parasabatinca Whalley, 1978 Lebanese amber, Barremian, Crato Formation, Brazil, Aptian
- † Terncladus Han, Zhang and Ren, 2024 Burmese amber, Myanmar, Cretaceous

== Sources ==
- O'Toole, Christopher. 2002. Firefly Encyclopedia of Insects and Spiders. ISBN 1-55297-612-2.
