= Lepidoptera fossil record =

Fossil record of butterflies and moths

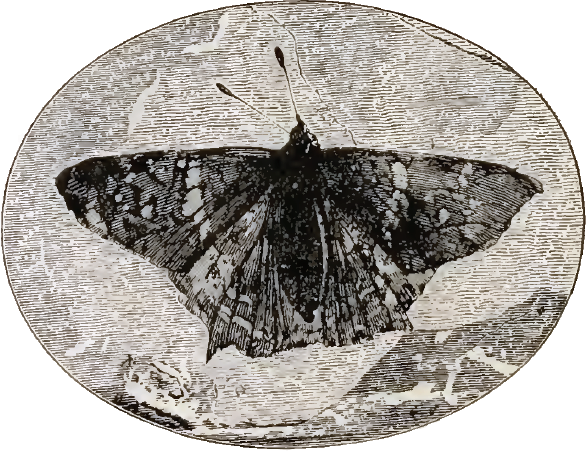
1887 engraving of Prodryas persephone, a fossil lepidopteran from the Eocene

The Lepidoptera fossil record encompasses all butterflies and moths that lived before recorded history. The fossil record for Lepidoptera is lacking in comparison to other winged species, and tending not to be as common as some other insects in the habitats that are most conducive to fossilization, such as lakes and ponds, and their juvenile stage has only the head capsule as a hard part that might be preserved. Yet there are fossils, some preserved in amber and some in very fine sediments. Leaf mines are also seen in fossil leaves, although the interpretation of them is tricky. Putative fossil stem group representatives of Amphiesmenoptera (the clade comprising Trichoptera and Lepidoptera) are known from the Triassic.

Previously, the earliest known lepidopteran fossils were three wings of Archaeolepis mane, a primitive moth-like species from the Jurassic, about 190 million years ago, found in Dorset, UK, which show scales with parallel grooves under a scanning electron microscope and a characteristic wing venation pattern shared with Trichoptera (caddisflies). In 2018, the discovery of exquisite fossilised scales from the Triassic-Jurassic boundary were reported in the journal Science Advances. They were found as rare palynological elements in the sediments of the Triassic-Jurassic boundary from the cored Schandelah-1 well, drilled near Braunschweig in northern Germany. This pushes back the fossil record and origin of glossatan lepidopterans by about 70 million years, supporting molecular estimates of a Norian (c. 212 million years) divergence of glossatan and non-glossatan lepidopterans. The authors of the study proposed that lepidopterans evolved a proboscis as an adaptation to drink from droplets and thin films of water for maintaining fluid balance in the hot and arid climate of the Triassic.

Only two more sets of Jurassic lepidopteran fossils have been found, as well as 13 sets from the Cretaceous, which all belong to primitive moth-like families. Many more fossils are found from the Cenozoic, and particularly the Eocene Baltic amber. The oldest genuine butterflies of the superfamily Papilionoidea have been found in the Early Eocene (Ypresian) MoClay or Fur Formation of Denmark. The best preserved fossil lepidopteran is considered to be the Eocene Prodryas persephone from the Florissant Fossil Beds.

== Phylogeny ==
Phylogenetic hypothesis of major lepidopteran lineages superimposed on the geologic time scale. Radiation of angiosperms spans 130–95 mya from their earliest forms to domination of vegetation.

Lepidoptera and Trichoptera (caddisflies) are more closely related to one another than to any other taxa, sharing many similarities that are lacking in other insect orders; for example the females of both orders are heterogametic, meaning they have two different sex chromosomes, whereas in most species the males are heterogametic and the females have two identical sex chromosomes. The adults in both orders display a particular wing venation pattern on their forewings. The larvae of both orders have mouth structures and a gland with which they make and manipulate silk. Willi Hennig grouped the two orders into the Amphiesmenoptera superorder; they are sisters, and together are sister to the extinct order Tarachoptera.

Micropterigidae, Agathiphagidae and Heterobathmiidae are the oldest and most basal lineages of Lepidoptera. The adults of these families do not have the curled tongue or proboscis, that are found in most members order, but instead have chewing mandibles adapted for a special diet. Micropterigidae larvae feed on leaves, fungi, or liverworts (much like the Trichoptera). Adult Micropterigidae chew the pollen or spores of ferns. In the Agathiphagidae, larvae live inside kauri pines and feed on seeds. In Heterobathmiidae the larvae feed on the leaves of Nothofagus, the southern beech tree. These families also have mandibles in the pupal stage, which help the pupa emerge from the seed or cocoon after metamorphosis.

The Eriocraniidae have a short coiled proboscis in the adult stage, and though they retain their pupal mandibles with which they escaped the cocoon, their mandibles are non-functional thereafter. Most of these non-ditrysian families, are primarily leaf miners in the larval stage. In addition to the proboscis, there is a change in the scales among these basal lineages, with later lineages showing more complex perforated scales.

With the evolution of the Ditrysia in the mid-Cretaceous, there was a major reproductive change. The Ditrysia, which comprise 98% of the Lepidoptera, have two separate openings for reproduction in the females (as well as a third opening for excretion), one for mating, and one for laying eggs. The two are linked internally by a seminal duct. (In more basal lineages there is one cloaca, or later, two openings and an external sperm canal.) Of the early lineages of Ditrysia, Gracillarioidea and Gelechioidea are mostly leaf miners, but more recent lineages feed externally. In the Tineoidea, most species feed on plant and animal detritus and fungi, and build shelters in the larval stage.

The Yponomeutoidea is the first group to have significant numbers of species whose larvae feed on herbaceous plants, as opposed to woody plants. They evolved about the time that flowering plants underwent an expansive adaptive radiation in the mid-Cretaceous, and the Gelechioidea that evolved at this time also have great diversity. Whether the processes involved co-evolution or sequential evolution, the diversity of the Lepidoptera and the angiosperms increased together.

In the so-called "macrolepidoptera", which constitutes about 60% of lepidopteran species, there was a general increase in size, better flying ability (via changes in wing shape and linkage of the forewings and hindwings), reduction in the adult mandibles, and a change in the arrangement of the crochets (hooks) on the larval prolegs, perhaps to improve the grip on the host plant. Many also have tympanal organs, that allow them to hear. These organs evolved eight times, at least, because they occur on different body parts and have structural differences. The main lineages in the macrolepidoptera are the Noctuoidea, Bombycoidea, Lasiocampidae, Mimallonoidea, Geometroidea and Rhopalocera. Bombycoidea plus Lasiocampidae plus Mimallonoidea may be a monophyletic group. The Rhopalocera, comprising the Papilionoidea (butterflies), Hesperioidea (skippers), and the Hedyloidea (moth-butterflies), are the most recently evolved. There is quite a good fossil record for this group, with the oldest skipper dating from 56 million years ago.

== Fossil Lepidoptera taxa ==
This is a list of all described fossil Lepidoptera species. Taxa marked with † are extinct.

=== Superfamily Bombycoidea ===
==== Family Saturniidae ====
- Rothschildia (Grote, 1896)
  - †Rothschildia fossilis (Cockerell, 1914) (originally in Attacus)

==== Family Sphingidae ====
- †Mioclanis (Zhang, Sun & Zhang, 1994)
  - †Mioclanis shanwangiana (Zhang, Sun & Zhang, 1994)
- †Sphingidites (Kernbach, 1967)
  - †Sphingidites weidneri (Kernbach, 1967)

=== Superfamily Copromorphoidea ===
==== Family Copromorphidae ====
- Copromorpha Meyrick, 1886
  - †Copromorpha fossilis Jarzembowski, 1980

=== Superfamily Cossoidea ===
==== Family Cossidae ====
- †Adelopsyche Cockerell, 1926
  - †Adelopsyche frustrans Cockerell, 1926 (Colorado, Florissant)
- †Gurnetia Cockerell, 1921
  - †Gurnetia durranti Cockerell, 1921 (Isle of Wight)

=== Superfamily †Eolepidopterigoidea ===
==== Family †Eolepidopterigidae ====
- †Daiopterix Skalski, 1984
  - †Daiopterix rasnitsyni Skalski, 1984
  - †Daiopterix olgae Kozlov, 1989
- †Eolepidopterix Rasnitsyn, 1983
  - Eolepidopterix jurassica Rasnitsyn, 1983
- Gracilepteryx Martins-Neto & Vulcano, 1989
  - †Gracilepteryx pulchra Martins-Neto & Vulcano, 1989
- †Netoxena Sohn in Sohn et al., 2012
  - †Netoxena nana (Martins-Neto, 1999)
- †Psamateia Martins-Neto, 2002
  - †Psamateia calipsa Martins-Neto, 2002
- †Undopterix Skalski, 1979 (sometimes in Undopterigidae Kozlov, 1988)
  - †Undopterix sukatshevae Skalski, 1979
  - †Undopterix cariensis Martins-Neto & Vulcano, 1989

=== Family Eriocraniidae ===
- †Eriocranites Kernbach, 1967
  - †Eriocranites hercynicus Kernbach, 1967

=== Superfamily Gelechioidea ===
==== Family Autostichidae ====
- †Symmocites Kusnezov, 1941
  - †Symmocites rohdendorfi Kusnezov, 1941

==== Family Elachistidae ====
- †Elachistites Kozlov, 1987
  - †Elachistites inclusus Kozlov, 1987 (Baltic region, Eocene)
  - †Elachistites sukatshevae Kozlov, 1987 (Baltic region, Eocene)

==== Family Ethmiidae ====
- Ethmia Hübner, [1819]
  - †Ethmia mortuella Scudder, 1890 (Colorado, Florissant)

==== Family Oecophoridae ====
- †Borkhausenites Rebel, 1934
  - †Borkhausenites angustipenella Rebel, 1935
  - †Borkhausenites bachofeni Rebel, 1934
  - †Borkhausenites crassella Rebel, 1935
  - †Borkhausenites implicatella Rebel, 1935
  - †Borkhausenites incolumella Rebel, 1934
  - †Borkhausenites ingentella Rebel, 1935
  - †Borkhausenites vulneratella Rebel, 1935
- †Depressarites Rebel, 1936
  - †Depressarites blastuliferella Rebel, 1935
  - †Depressarites levipalpella Rebel, 1935
- †Epiborkhausenites Skalski, 1973 (Bartonian, Baltic amber, Lithuania)
  - †Epiborkhausenites obscurotrimaculatus Skalski, 1973
- †Glesseumeyrickia Kusnezov, 1941
  - †Glesseumeyrickia henrikseni Kusnezov, 1941
- †Hexerites Cockerell, 1933 (originally in Thyrididae)
  - †Hexerites primalis Cockerell, 1933
- †Microsymmocites Skalski, 1977
  - †Microsymmocites Skalski, 1977
- †Neoborkhausenites Skalski, 1977
  - †Neoborkhausenites incertella (Rebel, 1935) (originally in Borkhausenites)
- †Palaeodepressaria Skalski, 1979
  - †Palaeodepressaria hannemanni Skalski, 1979
  - †Paraborkhausenites Kusnezov, 1941
  - †Paraborkhausenites innominatus Kusnezov, 1941
  - †Paraborkhausenites vicinella (Rebel, 1935) (originally in Borkhausenites)

==== Family Symmocidae ====
- †Oegoconiites Kusnezov, 1941
  - †Oegoconiites borisjaki Kusnezov, 1941 (Baltic region, Oligocene amber)

=== Superfamily Geometroidea ===
==== Family Geometridae ====
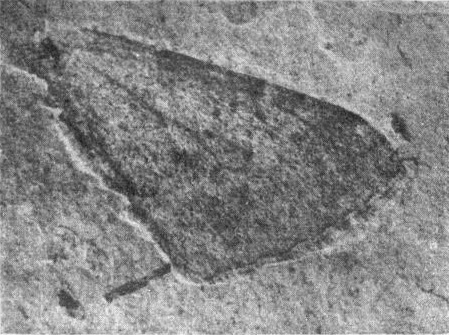
Hydriomena? protrita holotype forewing

- †Geometridites Clark et al., 1971
  - †Geometridites jordani Kernbach, 1967 (Willershausen, Pliocene)
  - †Geometridites larentiiformis Jarzembowski, 1980
  - †Geometridites repens Kernbach, 1967
- Hydriomena Hübner, (1825)
  - †Hydriomena? protrita Cockerell, 1922 (Priabonian, Florissant Formation, Colorado)

=== Superfamily Gracillarioidea ===
==== Family Bucculatricidae ====
- Bucculatrix Zeller, 1839
  - †Bucculatrix platani Kozlov, 1988 (Kazakhstan, Late Cretaceous)

==== Family Gracillariidae ====
- †Gracillariites Kozlov, 1987
  - †Gracillariites lithuanicus Kozlov, 1987
  - †Gracillariites mixtus Kozlov, 1987
- Two undescribed Phyllocnistis species
- One undescribed Lithocolletis species

=== Superfamily Hepialoidea ===
==== Family Hepialidae ====
- †Oiophassus J. F. Zhang, 1989
  - †Oiophassus nycterus Zhang, 1989
- †Prohepialus Piton, 1940
  - †Prohepialus incertus Piton, 1940 (Menat, France, Cenozoic)
- †Protohepialus Pierce, 1945
  - †Protohepialus comstocki Pierce, 1945

=== Superfamily Adeloidea ===
==== Family Adelidae ====
- Adela Latreille, 1796
  - †Adela kuznetzovi Kozlov, 1987
  - †Adela similis Kozlov, 1987
- †Adelites Rebel 1934
  - †Adelites electrella Rebel, 1934
  - †Adelites purpurascens Rebel, 1935
  - †Adelites serraticornella Rebel, 1935
  - An undescribed †Adelites species

==== Family Incurvariidae ====
- †Incurvarites Rebel, 1934
  - †Incurvarites alienella Rebel, 1934
- †Prophalonia Rebel, 1936 (originally placed in Tortricidae)
  - †Prophalonia gigas Rebel, 1935
  - †Prophalonia scutitarsella Rebel, 1935

=== Superfamily Micropterigoidea ===
==== Family Micropterigidae ====
- †Auliepterix Kozlov, 1989
  - †Auliepterix minima Kozlov, 1989
  - †Auliepterix mirabilis Kozlov, 1989
- †Baltimartyria Skalski, 1995
  - †Baltimartyria rasnitsyni Mey, 2011
  - †Baltimartyria proavitella (Rebel, 1936)
- Micropterix Hübner, 1825
  - †Micropterix anglica Jarzembowski, 1980
  - †Micropterix gertraudae Kurz M. A & M. E. Kurz, 2010
  - †Micropterix immensipalpa (Kusnezov, 1941) (sometimes placed in Eriocraniidae as Electrocrania immensipalpa)
- †Moleropterix Engel & Kinzelbach, 2008
  - †Moleropterix kalbei Engel & Kinzelbach, 2008 (sometimes placed in Eolepidopterigidae)
- †Palaeolepidopterix Kozlov, 1989
  - †Palaeolepidopterix aurea Kozlov, 1989
- †Palaeosabatinca Kozlov, 1989
  - †Palaeosabatinca zherichini Kozlov, 1988
- †Parasabatinca Whalley, 1978
  - †Parasabatinca aftimacrai Whalley, 1978
  - †Parasabatinca caldasae Martins Neto & Vulcano, 1989
- Sabatinca Walker, 1863
  - †Sabatinca perveta (Cockerell, 1919)

=== Superfamily Nepticuloidea ===
==== Family Nepticulidae ====
- †Foliofossor Jarzembowski, 1989
  - †Foliofossor cranei Jarzembwoski, 1989 (Paleocene; England; mines in Platanus sp. leaves) (originally placed in Agromyzidae)
- †Stigmellites Kernbach, 1967
  - †Stigmellites araliae (Fric, 1882) (Czech Republic; mine in Araliaceae sp. leaf)
  - †Stigmellites baltica (Kozlov, 1988) (Eocene; Baltic amber; mine)
  - †Stigmellites caruini-orientalis Straus, 1977 (Pliocene; Hessen, Germany; mine in Carpinus orientalis fossilis leaf)
  - †Stigmellites heringi Kernbach, 1967 (Pliocene; Hessen, Germany; mine in Berberis sp. leaf)
  - †Stigmellites kzyldzharica (Kozlov, 1988) (Kazakhstan; mine in Platanus sp. leaf)
  - †Stigmellites messelensis Straus, 1976 (Eocene; Messel, Germany; mine)
  - †Stigmellites pliotityrella Kernbach, 1967 (Pliocene; Hessen, Germany; mine in Fagus silvatica leaf)
  - †Stigmellites samsonovi Kozlov, 1988 (Kazakhstan; mine in Trochodendroides arctica leaf)
  - †Stigmellites serpentina (Kozlov, 1988) (Kazakhstan mine in Trochodendroides arctica leaf)
  - †Stigmellites sharovi (Kozlov, 1988) (Kazakhstan mine in Trochodendroides arctica leaf)
  - †Stigmellites tyshchenkoi (Kozlov, 1988) (Kazakhstan mine in Platanus latior leaf)
  - †Stigmellites zelkovae Straus, 1977 (Pliocene; Hessen, Germany; mine in Zelkova sp. leaf)

=== Superfamily Noctuoidea ===
==== Family Arctiidae ====
- †Oligamatites Kusnezov, 1928
  - †Oligamatites martynovi Kusnezov, 1928 (Kazakhstan, Upper Oligocene)
- †Stauropolia Skalski, 1988
  - †Stauropolia nekrutenkoi Skalski, 1988 (Caucasus, Miocene)

==== Family Lymantriidae ====
- One undescribed Euproctis species

==== Family Noctuidae ====
- †Noctuites Heer, 1849
  - †Noctuites haidingeri Heer, 1849 (Croatia, Radoboj, Cenozoic)
- †Xyleutites Kozhanchikov, 1957
  - †Xyleutites miocenicus Kozhanchikov, 1957 (northern Caucasus, Miocene) (originally in Cossidae)

==== Family Notodontidae ====
- †Cerurites Kernbach, 1967
  - †Cerurites wagneri Kernbach, 1967 (Germany, Willershausen, Cenozoic)

=== Superfamily Papilionoidea ===
==== Basal or incertae sedis ====
- †Lithodryas Cockerell, 1909 – Lycaenidae, Nymphalidae?
  - †Lithodryas styx (Scudder, 1889)
- †Lithopsyche Butler, 1889 – Lycaenidae, Riodinidae?
  - †Lithopsyche antiqua Butler, 1889
- †Riodinella Durden & Rose, 1978
  - †Riodinella nympha Durden & Rose, 1978 (Colorado, Middle Eocene) – Nymphalidae, Pieridae, Riodinidae?

==== Family Hesperiidae ====
- †Pamphilites Scudder, 1875
  - †Pamphilites abdita Scudder, 1875 (Aix-en-Provence, Oligocene)
- †Thanatites Scudder, 1875
  - †Thanatites vetula (Heyden, 1859) (Western Germany, Cenozoic) (originally in Nymphalidae)

==== Family Lycaenidae ====
- †Aquisextana Theobald, 1937
  - †Aquisextana irenaei Theobald, 1937 (France, Early Oligocene)

==== Family Nymphalidae ====
- †Apanthesis Scudder, 1889
  - †Apanthesis leuce Scudder, 1889 (Colorado, Florissant)
- †Barbarothea Scudder, 1892
  - †Barbarothea florissanti Scudder, 1892 (Colorado, Florissant)
- Doxocopa Hübner, 1819
  - †Doxocopa wilmattae (Cockerell, 1907) (Colorado, Florissant) (originally in Chlorippe)
- Hestina Westwood, 1850
  - Hestina japonica (C. & R. Felder)
- †Jupitellia Carpenter, 1985
  - †Jupitellia charon (Scudder, 1889) (originally in Jupiteria)
- †Lethites Scudder, 1875
  - †Lethites reynesii (Scudder, 1872)
- Undescribed Limenitis species
- †Mylothrites Scudder, 1875
  - †Mylothrites pluto (Heer, 1850) (Europe, Oligocene) (originally in Vanessa)
- †Neorinella Martins, Kucera-Santos, Vieira & Fr, 1993
  - †Neorinella garciae Martines-Neto, 1993
- †Neorinopis Butler, 1873
  - †Neorinopis sepulta (Boisduval, 1840) (France, Early Oligocene)
- †Nymphalites Scudder, 1889
  - †Nymphalites obscurum Scudder, 1889 (Colorado, Florissant)
  - †Nymphalites scudderi Beutenmller and Cockerell, 1908
  - †Nymphalites zeuneri Jarembowski, 1980
- †Prodryas Scudder, 1878
  - †Prodryas persephone Scudder, 1878
- †Prolibythea Scudder, 1889
  - †Prolibythea vagabunda Scudder, 1889 (Colorado, Florissant)
- Vanessa Fabricius, 1807
  - †Vanessa amerindica Miller & Brown, 1989 (Colorado, Florissant)

==== Family Papilionidae ====
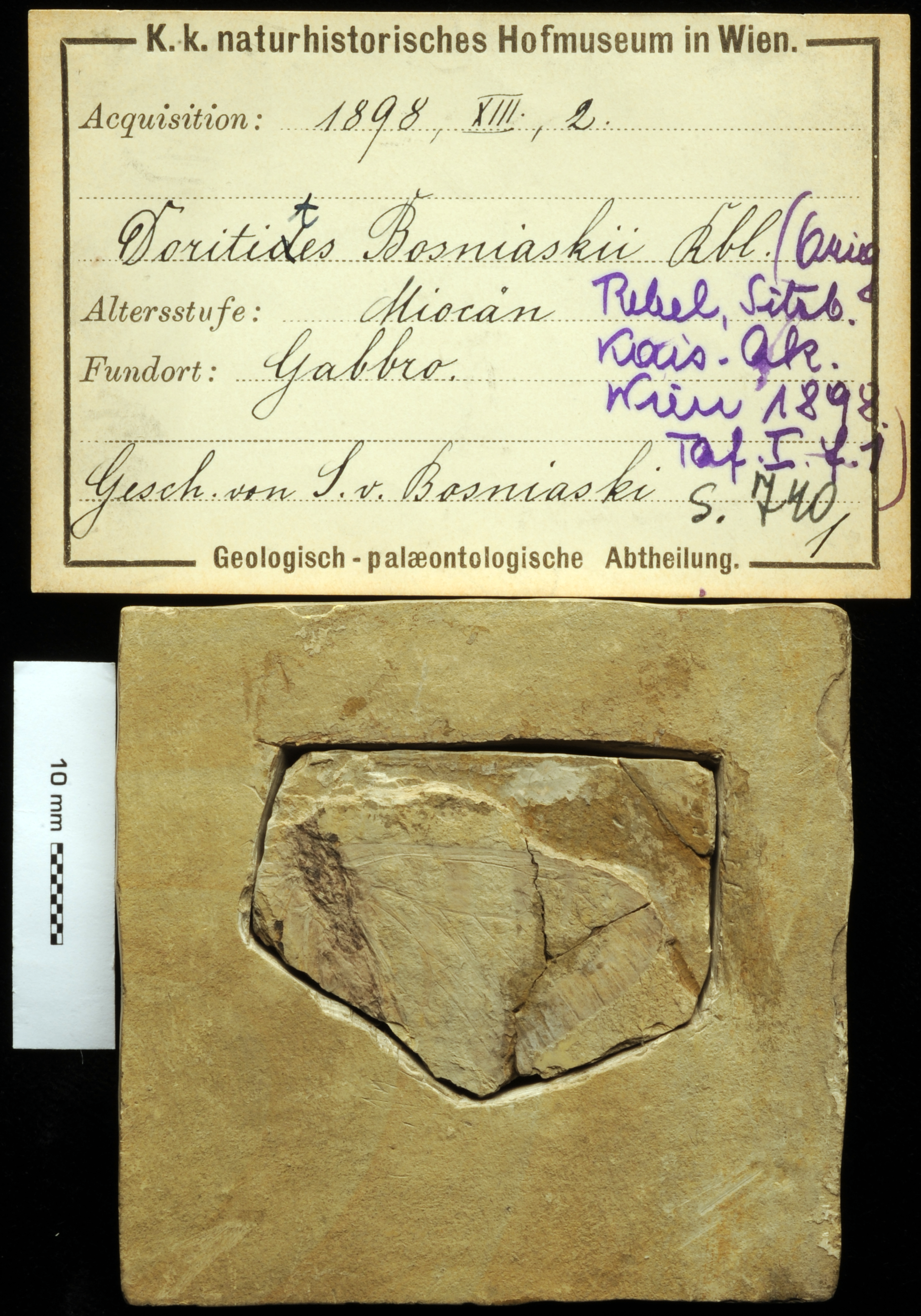
Doritites bosniackii

- †Doritites Rebel, 1898
  - †Doritites bosniackii Rebel, 1898 (Italy, Tuscany, Miocene) (sometimes in Luehdorfia)
- †Praepapilio Durden & Rose, 1978
  - †Praepapilio colorado Durden & Rose, 1978
  - †Praepapilio gracilis Durden & Rose 1978
- †Thaites Scudder, 1875
  - †Thaites ruminianus Scudder, 1875 (France, Aix-en-Provence, Oligocene)

==== Family Pieridae ====
- †Coliates Scudder, 1875
  - †Coliates proserpina Scudder, 1875
- †Oligodonta Brown, 1976
  - †Oligodonta florissantensis Brown, 1976 (Colorado, Oligocene)
- Pontia Fabricius, 1807
  - †Pontia freyeri (Heer, 1849)
- †Stolopsyche Scudder, 1889
  - †Stolopsyche libytheoides Scudder, 1889 (Colorado, Cenozoic)

==== Family Riodinidae ====
- Voltinia Stichel, 1910
  - †Voltinia dramba Hall, Robbins & Harvey 2004

=== Superfamily Pterophoroidea ===
==== Family Pterophoridae ====
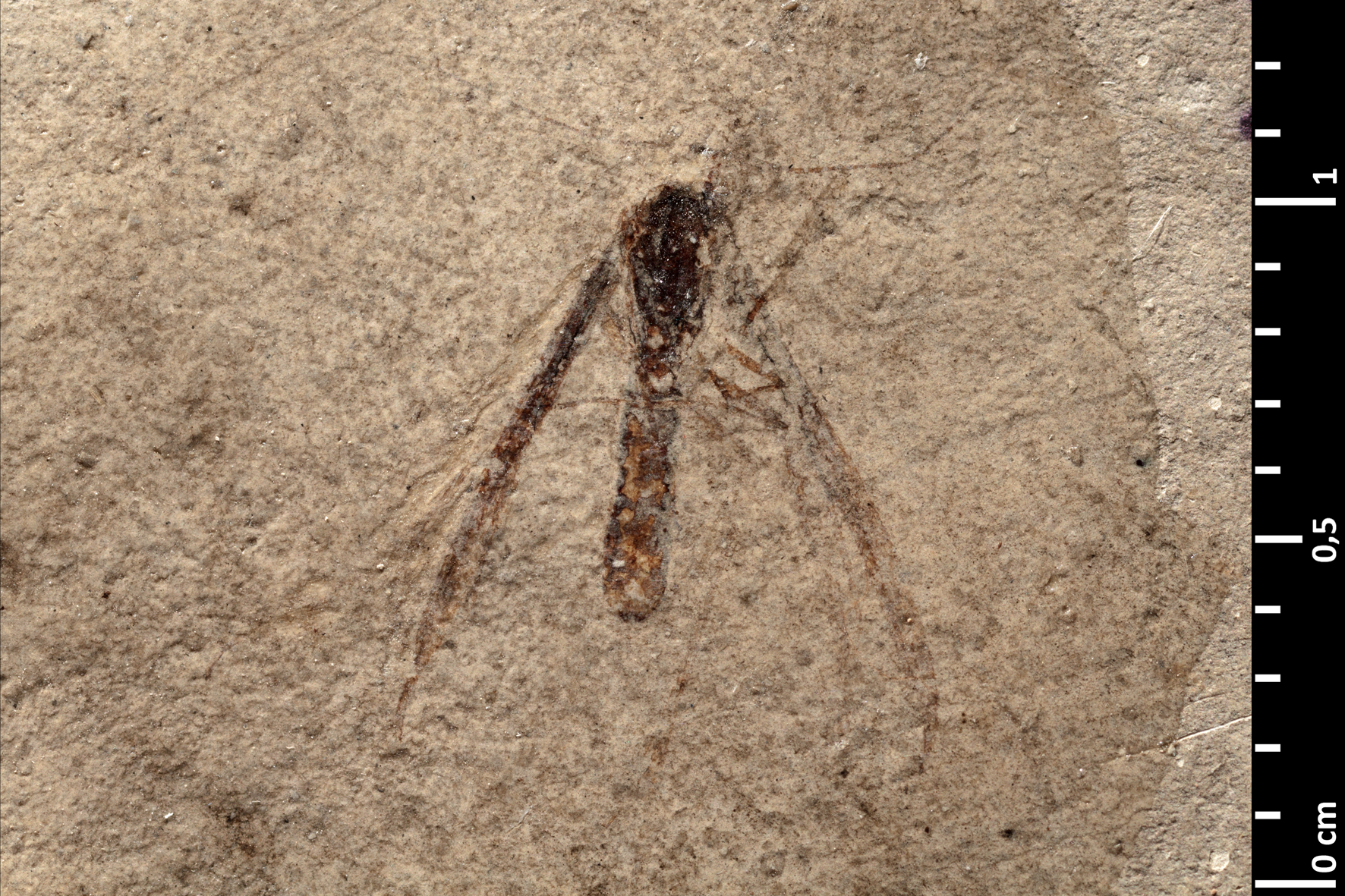
Merrifieldia oligocenicus

- Merrifieldia Tutt, 1905
  - †Merrifieldia oligocenicus (Bigot, Nel & Nel, 1986) (synonym=†Pterophorus oligocenus)

=== Superfamily Pyraloidea ===
==== Family Pyralidae ====
- †Gallerites Kernbach, 1967
  - †Gallerites keleri Kernbach, 1967
- †Glendotricha Kusnezov, 1941
  - †Glendotricha olgae Kusnezov, 1941
- †Pyralites Heer, 1856
  - †Pyralites obscures Heer, 1856
  - †Pyralites preecei Jarzembowski, 1980

=== Superfamily Sesioidea ===
==== Family Castniidae ====
- †Dominickus Tindale, 1985
  - †Dominickus castinodes Tindale, 1985 (Priabonian, Florissant Formation, Colorado)

=== Superfamily Tineoidea ===
==== Family Psychidae ====
- Dahlica Enderlein, 1912
  - Dahlica triquetrella (Hübner, 1813) (Baltic amber)
- †Palaeopsyche Sobczyk & Kobbert, 2009
  - †Palaeopsyche secundum Sobczyk & Kobbert, 2009 (Baltic amber)
  - †Palaeopsyche transversum Sobczyk & Kobbert, 2009 (Baltic amber)
- †Psychites Kozlov, 1989
  - †Psychites pristinella Kozlov, 1989 (Baltic region, Cenozoic, amber)
- Siederia Meier, 1957
  - Siederia pineti (Zeller, 1852)
- Sterrhopterix Hübner, 1825
  - †Sterrhopteryx pristinella Rebel, 1934
- Taleporia Hübner, 1825
  - Taleporia tubulosa (Retzius, 1783)
- Bacotia Tutt, 1899
  - Bacotia claustrella (Bruand, 1845)

==== Family Tineidae ====
- †Architinea Rebel, 1934
  - †Architinea balticella Rebel, 1934
  - †Architinea sepositella Rebel, 1934
- †Dysmasiites Kusnezov, 1941
  - †Dysmasiites carpenteri Kusnezov, 1941
- †Electromeessia Kozlov, 1987
  - †Electromeessia zagulijaevi Kozlov, 1987 (Baltic region, Eocene amber)
- †Glessoscardia Kusnezov, 1941
  - †Glessoscardia gerasimovi Kusnezov, 1941
- †Martynea Kusnezov, 1941
  - †Martynea rebeli Kusnezov, 1941
- †Monopibaltia Skalski, 1974
  - †Monopibaltia ignitella Skalski, 1974 (Baltic region, Eocene amber)
- †Palaeoinfurcitinea Kozlov, 1987
  - †Palaeoinfurcitinea rohdendorfi Kozlov, 1987 (Russia, Eocene amber)
- †Palaeoscardiites Kusnezov, 1941
  - †Palaeoscardiites mordvilkoi Kusnezov, 1941
- †Palaeotinea Kozlov, 1987
  - †Palaeotinea rasnitsyni Kozlov, 1987
- †Paratriaxomasia Jarzembowski, 1980
  - †Paratriaxomasia solentensis Jarzembowski, 1980
- †Proscardiites Kusnezov, 1941
  - †Proscardiites martynovi Kusnezov, 1941
- †Pseudocephitinea Kozlov, 1987
  - †Pseudocephitinea svetlanae Kozlov, 1987 (Russia, Eocene amber)
- †Scardiites Kusnezov, 1941
  - †Scardiites meyricki Kusnezov, 1941
- †Simulotenia Skalski, 1977
  - †Simulotenia intermedia Skalski, 1977
- †Tillyardinea Kusnezov, 1941
  - †Tillyardinea eocaenica Kusnezov, 1941
- Tinea Linnaeus, 1758
  - †Tinea antique Rebel, 1822
- †Tineitella T. B. Fletcher, 1940
  - †Tineitella crystalli Kawall, 1876 (originally in Tineites)
  - †Tineitella sucinacius Kozlov, 1987 (originally in Tineites)
- †Tineolamima Rebel, 1934
  - †Tineolamima aurella Rebel, 1934
- †Tineosemopsis Skalski, 1974
  - †Tineosemopsis decurtatus Skalski, 1974

=== Superfamily Tortricoidea ===
==== Family Tortricidae ====
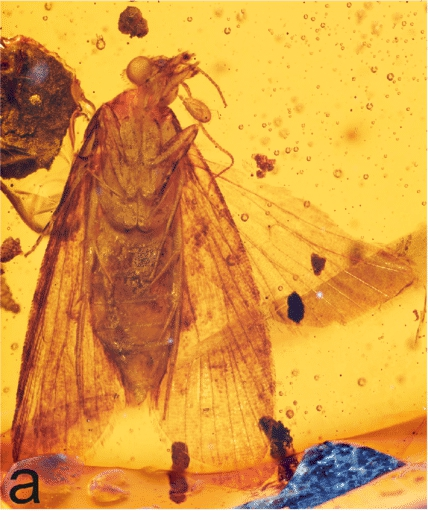
Antiquatortia histuroides

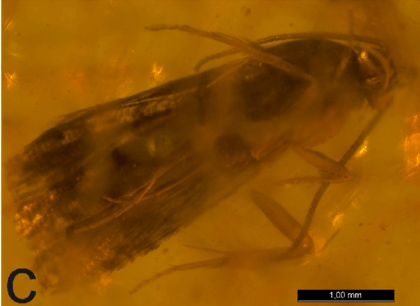
Electresia zalesskii

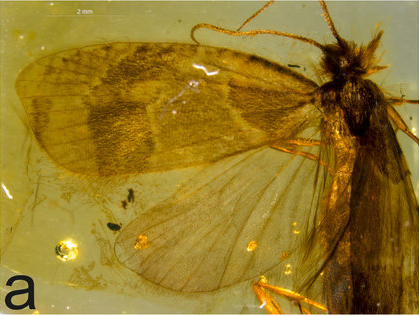
Tortricidrosis inclusa

- †Antiquatortia
  - †Antiquatortia histuroides Brown & Baixeras, 2018 (Dominican amber)
- †Electresia Kusnezov, 1941
  - †Electresia zalesskii Kusnezov, 1941 (Tanzania, Copal)
- †Tortricibaltia Skalski, 1992
  - †Tortricibaltia diakonoffi Skalski, 1981 (Baltic amber)
- †Tortricidrosis Skalski, 1973
  - †Tortricidrosis inclusa Skalski, 1973 (Baltic amber)

=== Superfamily Yponomeutoidea ===
==== Family Heliodinidae ====
- †Baltonides Skalski, 1981
  - †Baltonides roeselliformis Skalski, 1981 (Baltic region, Late Eocene)

==== Family Lyonetiidae ====
- †Prolyonetia Kusnezov, 1941 (Eocene; Baltic amber, Europe)
  - †Prolyonetia cockerelli Kusnezov, 1941

==== Family Yponomeutidae ====
- †Epinomeuta Rebel, 1936
  - †Epinomeuta truncatipennella Rebel, 1936

=== Superfamily Zygaenoidea ===
==== Family Zygaenidae ====
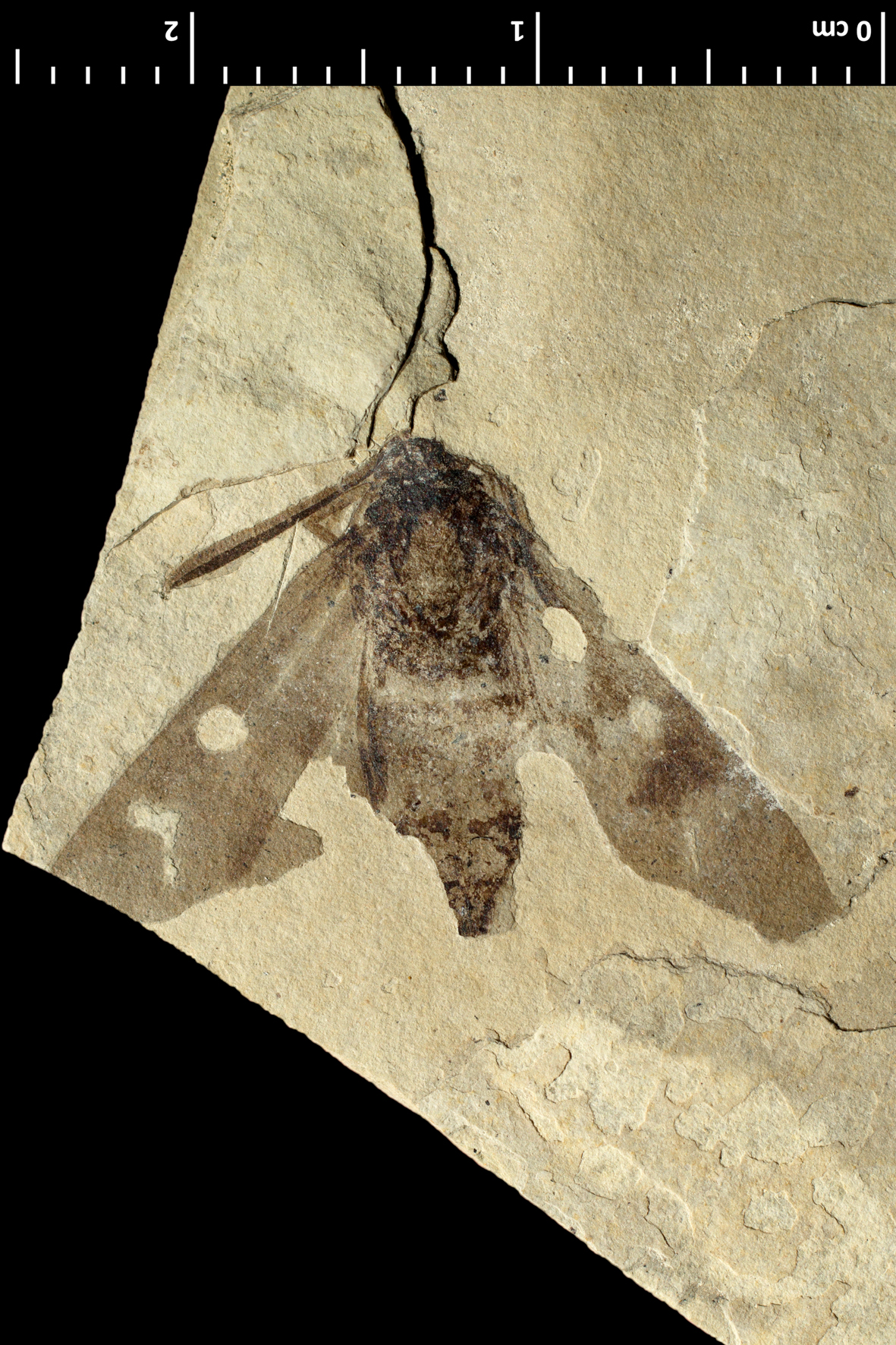
Neurosymploca? oligocenica

- Neurosymploca Wallengren, 1858
  - †Neurosymploca? oligocenica Fernández-Rubio & Nel, 2000 (Lower Stampian, Céreste, Alpes-de-Haute-Provence, France)
- Zygaena Fabricius, 1775
  - †"Zygaena" miocaenica Reiss, 1936 (Germany)
  - †"Zygaena" turolensis Fernández-Rubio, de Olano & Cunarro, 1991
- †Zygaenites Burgeff, 1951
  - †Zygaenites controversus Burgeff, 1951 (Germany, Miocene)

=== Superfamily unassigned ===
==== Family †Archaeolepidae ====
- †Archaeolepis Whalley, 1985
  - †Archaeolepis mane Whalley, 1985

==== Family †Curvicubitidae ====
- †Curvicubitus Hong, 1984
  - †Curvicubitus triassicus Hong, 1984 (China, Middle Triassic)

==== Family †Mesokristenseniidae ====
- †Mesokristensenia Huang, Nel & Minet, 2010
  - †Mesokristensenia angustipenna Huang, Nel & Minet, 2010
  - †Mesokristensenia latipenna Huang, Nel & Minet, 2010
  - †Mesokristensenia sinica Huang, Nel & Minet, 2010

=== Superfamily unassigned ===
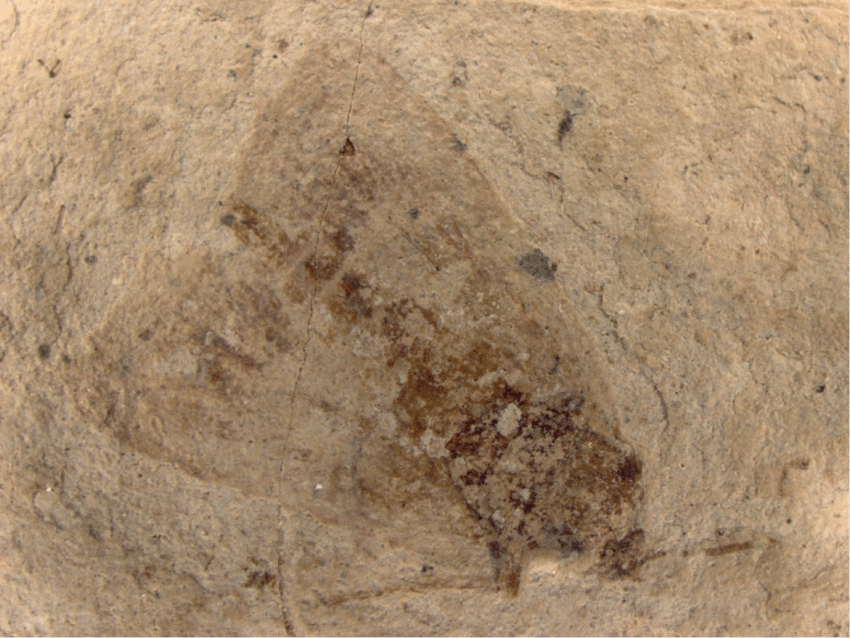
Paleolepidopterites destructus

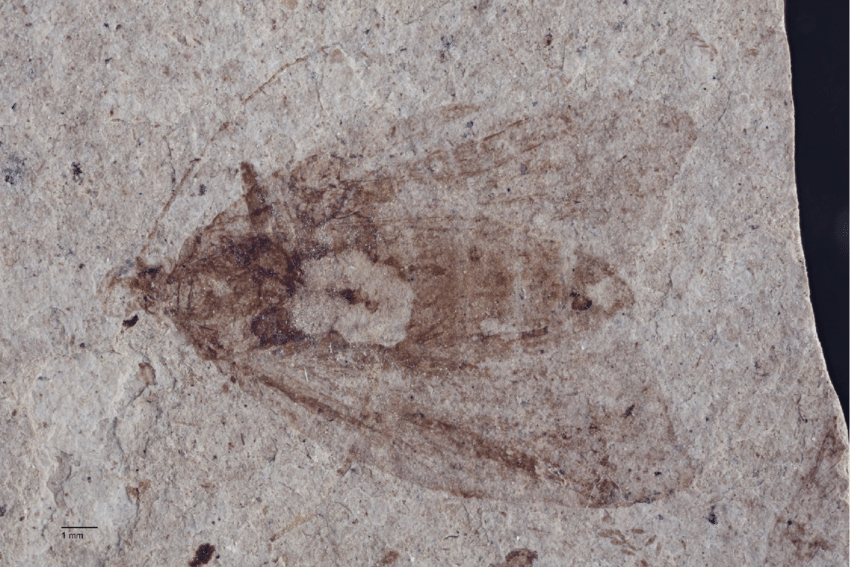
Paleolepidopterites florissantanus

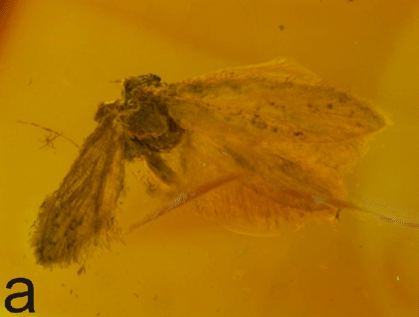
Spatalistiforma submerga

- †Bombycites Heer, 1849
  - †Bombycites oeningensis Heer, 1849 (Croatia, Oeningen, described from a pupa)
- †Karataunia Kozlov, 1989
  - †Karataunia lapidaria Kozlov, 1989 (Kazakhstan, Upper Jurassic)
- †Paleolepidopterites Kozlov, 2018
  - †Paleolepidopterites destructus Cockerell, 1916 (Priabonian, Florissant Formation, Colorado)
  - †Paleolepidopterites florissantanus Cockerell, 1907 (Priabonian, Florissant Formation, Colorado)
- †Phylledestes Cockerell, 1907
  - †Phylledestes vorax Cockerell, 1907 (Colorado, Florissant – in the Miocene shales, described from a larva)
- †Protolepis Kozlov, 1989
  - †Protolepis cuprealata Kozlov, 1989 (Kazakhstan, Upper Jurassic)
- †Spatalistiforma Skalski, 1992
  - †Spatalistiforma submerga Skalski, 1981 (Baltic amber)
- †Thermojana Yang & Chen, 1995
  - †Thermojana sinica Yang & Chen, 1995 (China) (originally placed in Eupterotidae)

== Excluded from Lepidoptera ==
Several fossils originally described as lepidopterans have subsequently been assigned to other groups, some as basal Amphiesmenoptera, others into other entirely distinct insect orders.

=== Superorder Amphiesmenoptera ===
==== Family †Eocoronidae ====
- †Eocorona Tindale, 1980
  - †Eocorona iani Tindale, 1980 (Queensland, Mid-Triassic)

=== Order Hemiptera ===
==== Family †Palaeontinidae (?) ====
- †Cyllonium Westwood, 1854
  - †Cyllonium boidusvalianum Westwood, 1854
  - †Cyllonium hewitsonianum Westwood, 1854

=== Order Mecoptera (?) ===
==== Family †Permochoristidae ====
- †Eoses Tindale, 1945
  - †Eoses triassica Tindale 1945, disputed to be a synonym of †Mesochorista proavita Tillyard 1916 in the Mecoptera

==== Family †Choristopsychidae ====
From the late middle Jurassic (164–165 mya) from the Daohugou fossil beds of Inner Mongolia.

- †Choristopsyche Martynov, 1937
  - †Choristopsyche tenuinervis Martynov, 1937
  - †Choristopsyche perfecta Qiao, Shih, Petrulevičius & Ren Dong, 2013
  - †Choristopsyche asticta Qiao, Shih, Petrulevičius & Ren Dong, 2013
- †Paristopsyche Qiao, Shih, Petrulevičius & Ren Dong, 2013
  - †Paristopsyche angelineae Qiao, Shih, Petrulevičius & Ren Dong, 2013

== See also ==
- List of extinct butterflies
- Prehistoric insects
