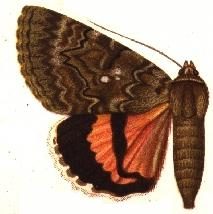

Scientific classification
- Kingdom: Animalia
- Phylum: Arthropoda
- Class: Insecta
- Order: Lepidoptera
- Superfamily: Noctuoidea
- Family: Erebidae
- Genus: Catocala
- Species: C. mesopotamica

Binomial name
- Catocala mesopotamica Kuznetsov, 1903

Synonyms
- Mormonia mesopotamica; Catocala hetaera Staudinger, 1895; Catocala aspasia Staudinger, 1897 (preocc. Strecker, 1874); Catocala staudingeri Beutenmüller, 1907

= Catocala mesopotamica =

Species of moth

Catocala mesopotamica is a moth of the family Erebidae first described by Nikolai Yakovlevich Kuznetsov in 1903. It is found in Turkey.
