= Willershausen =

Willershausen may refer to:

- Marcus Willershausen (born 2000), Swedish politician
- Willershausen (Herleshausen)
- Willershausen (Kalefeld)

== See also ==
- Wildeshausen
- Waltershausen
- Wülfershausen
- Wolfershausen
