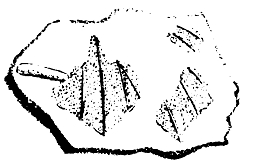
- Cyllonium boidusvalianum
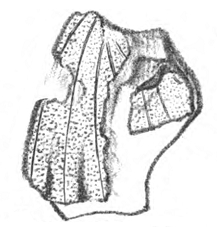
- Cyllonium hewitsonianum

Scientific classification
- Kingdom: Animalia
- Phylum: Arthropoda
- Class: Insecta
- Order: Hemiptera
- Suborder: Auchenorrhyncha
- Family: †Palaeontinidae
- Genus: †Cyllonium; Westwood, 1854

Species
- See text

= Cyllonium =

Cyllonium Temporal range: Berriasian

Genus of true bugs

Cyllonium is a genus of extinct insects. It contains two species.

== Discovery ==
Both species of Cyllonium were first described by the English entomologist John Obadiah Westwood. The fossils were recovered from the Early Cretaceous (Berriasian age) of the Lower Purbeck formation, Durdlestone Bay, England.

== Taxonomy ==
Very little is known of the two fossils as they were published without description. Illustrations, however, were provided, but even these show that the fossils were fragmentary. They were originally identified to be butterflies, but this is now generally not accepted.

They have been tentatively identified as possible palaeontinids (extinct giant cicadas) in 1961.

== Species ==
The two species assigned to the genus are the following:

- †Cyllonium boidusvalianum Westwood, 1854
- †Cyllonium hewitsonianum Westwood, 1854

== See also ==
- Cicadomorpha
- Lepidoptera fossil record
