= Nikolai Kuznetsov (entomologist) =

Russian Empire and Soviet entomologist, paleoentomologist and physiologist

Nikolai Yakovlevich Kuznetsov (Russian: Николай Яковлевич Кузнецов; May 23, 1873 in Saint Petersburg – April 8, 1948 in Leningrad) was a Russian and Soviet entomologist, paleoentomologist and physiologist, since 1910 was member of the Russian Entomological Society. Professor Kuznetsov was very important as a pioneer in the fields of insect physiology, Lepidoptera fauna of the Arctic (Siberia) and knowledge of fossils of Lepidoptera.

He influenced the very famous lepidopterist and writer Vladimir Nabokov: "At the age of eight he [Nabokov] began reading serious books on entomology from the family library and at nine he already attempted to make his first scientific discovery, writing about it to the leading Russian lepidopterist, Nikolay Kuznetsov. Kuznetsov's reply disappointed the young naturalist: it turned out that the insect in question had already been described." Years later Nabokov called the work "Fauna of Russia and Adjacent Countries – Lepidoptera" his masterpiece, "unsurpassed by any other general survey of the morphology of Lepidoptera".

== Biography ==
He graduated from the University of St. Petersburg in 1895. Then he was appointed demonstrator in animal physiology at the university and later became a lecturer, and a professor. He also lectured on entomology and insect physiology at the Institute of Applied, Zoology, but, his main interest was centred at the Zoological Institute of the Academy of Sciences, where he was in charge of Lepidoptera for more than forty years, he was specialized in the family Pieridae and also studied fossil insects in amber. He was colleague and friend of Grigory Grum-Grshimailo. He was awarded the Order of the Red Banner of Labour.

== Legacy ==
His personal collection of specimens of Lepidoptera, including the acquisition of the Wocke's collection, today is at the Zoological Institute (St. Petersburg).

He described the following species of Lepidoptera:

- Biston hypoleucus
- Catocala mesopotamica
- Catocala orba
- Haplochrois theae
- Pseudochazara euxina

He also described the extinct genera Electresia, Glendotricha, Oegoconiites, Oligamatites, Prolyonetia, Symmocites and the extinct species Micropterix immensipalpa as Electrocrania immensipalpa.

== Selected works ==
- 1910 (second edition): translation by Kuznetsov into Russian language from David Sharp's "Insects" (Volumes V and VI of the series "Cambridge Natural History", 1895 and 1899)
- 1925: Some new Eastern and American elements in the fauna Lepidoptera of Polar Europa. // Доклады АН СССР, серия A: 119—122.
- 1938."The Eurasian Arctic Fauna and Its Origin (Mainly Based on the Data on Lepidoptera)". Trudy Zool. Inst. Akad. Nauk SSSR 5, 1–85.
- 1941. "A Revision of the Amber Lepidoptera." (In Russ. & English.) Édition Acad. Sci. U.R.S.S. (Moscow): 135 pp., 31 pls.
- 1948-1949: Основы физиологии насекомых. — Édition Acad. Sci. U.R.S.S. (Moscow), Volumes 1-2. (In Russ.)[Fundamentals of Insect Physiology]
- 1967. "Fauna of Russia and Adjacent Countries – Lepidoptera". Israel Program for Scientific Translations, Jerusalem.[translation from Russian of "Nasekomye cheshuekrylye" or "Насекомые чешуекрылые (Insecta, Lepidoptera)"(Petrograd 1915)].

== See also ==
- Prehistoric Lepidoptera
