= Sphingidites =

Scientific classification
- Domain: Eukaryota
- Kingdom: Animalia
- Phylum: Arthropoda
- Class: Insecta
- Order: Lepidoptera
- Family: Sphingidae
- Tribe: Sphingini
- Genus: †Sphingidites; Kernbach, 1967
- Species: †S. weidneri

Binomial name
- †Sphingidites weidneri Kernbach, 1967

Extinct genus of moths

Sphingidites is an extinct and monotypic moth genus in the family Sphingidae. Its only species is Sphingidites weidneri. It is a compression fossil of a prepupal larva. Both the genus and species were first described by Kurt Kernbach in 1967. The fossil was found at Willershausen clay pit in Germany and it was dated to the Pliocene.
