= Pamphilites =

Pamphilites Temporal range: Lower Oligocene

Scientific classification
- Kingdom: Animalia
- Phylum: Arthropoda
- Clade: Pancrustacea
- Class: Insecta
- Order: Lepidoptera
- Family: Hesperiidae
- Subfamily: Hesperiinae
- Genus: †Pamphilites
- Species: †P. abdita

Binomial name
- †Pamphilites abdita Scudder, 1875

Extinct genus of butterflies

Pamphilites is an extinct genus of skippers in the family Hesperiidae. It contains only one fossil species, Pamphilites abdita, recovered from the Tertiary of Aix-en-Provence, France.

== Discovery ==
Pamphilites abdita was described in 1875 by the American entomologist and paleontologist Samuel Hubbard Scudder. The fossil was a single forewing recovered from the Lower Oligocene in Aix-en-Provence, France. The fossil wing is believed to have belonged to a female as it was lacking a prominent stigma (a patch of androconial scales).

The type specimen, however, has since been lost.

== Taxonomy ==
Based on the shape and venation of the fossil wing, Scudder classified it as belonging to the subfamily Hesperiinae of the skipper butterfly family (Hesperiidae). Skipper butterflies belong to the superfamily Hesperioidea of the order Lepidoptera.

== See also ==
- Prehistoric Lepidoptera
