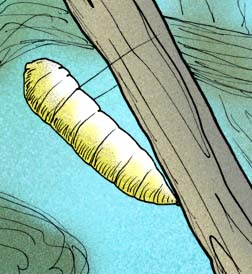
- Artist's reconstruction

Scientific classification
- Kingdom: Animalia
- Phylum: Arthropoda
- Clade: Pancrustacea
- Class: Insecta
- Order: Lepidoptera
- Family: incertae sedis
- Genus: †Bombycites; Heer, 1849
- Species: †B. oeningensis

Binomial name
- †Bombycites oeningensis Heer, 1849

= Bombycites =

Bombycites Temporal range: Upper Miocene

Extinct genus of moths

Bombycites oeningensis is an extinct lepidopteran from the Messinian (7-5 million years ago) of Öhningen, Switzerland. It is described in 1849 from a fossil pupa by the Swiss geologist and naturalist Oswald Heer. Because neither the adult nor larval forms are known, either of which contain crucial diagnostic features, its familial and superfamilial placement is uncertain.

== See also ==
- Prehistoric Lepidoptera
