= Karataunia =

Karataunia Temporal range: Upper Jurassic

Scientific classification
- Kingdom: Animalia
- Phylum: Arthropoda
- Clade: Pancrustacea
- Class: Insecta
- Order: Lepidoptera
- Family: incertae sedis
- Genus: †Karataunia; Kozlov, 1989

Type species
- †Karataunia lapidaria Kozlov, 1989

Extinct genus of butterflies

Karataunia is an extinct genus of butterfly from the Upper Jurassic of Karatau, Kazakhstan. It contains only one species, Karataunia lapidaria. Its family and superfamily placement is uncertain.

== See also ==
- Prehistoric Lepidoptera
