= Phylledestes =

Phylledestes Temporal range: Miocene

Scientific classification
- Kingdom: Animalia
- Phylum: Arthropoda
- Clade: Pancrustacea
- Class: Insecta
- Order: Lepidoptera
- Family: incertae sedis
- Genus: †Phylledestes; Cockerell, 1907

Type species
- †Phylledestes vorax Cockerell, 1907

Extinct genus of butterflies

Phylledestes is an extinct genus of butterfly from the Miocene shales of Florissant, Colorado. It contains only one species, Phylledestes vorax, described from a fossil larva. Its family and superfamily placement is uncertain, though it has been proposed to belong to the family Noctuidae of the superfamily Noctuoidea.

== See also ==
- Prehistoric Lepidoptera
- Prehistoric insects
- Florissant Fossil Beds National Monument
