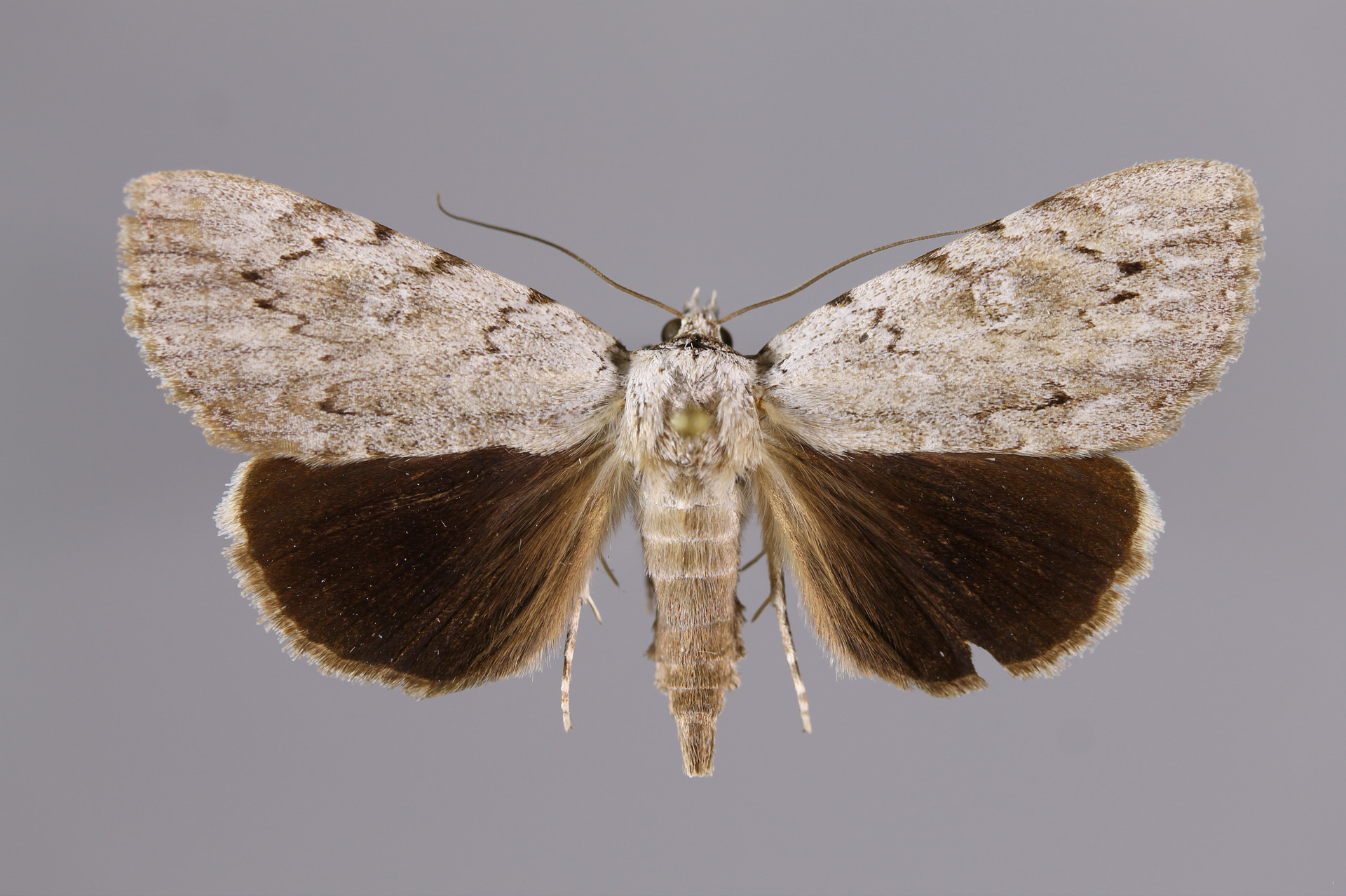

Scientific classification
- Kingdom: Animalia
- Phylum: Arthropoda
- Class: Insecta
- Order: Lepidoptera
- Superfamily: Noctuoidea
- Family: Erebidae
- Genus: Catocala
- Species: C. orba

Binomial name
- Catocala orba Kuznetsov, 1903

= Catocala orba =

Orba underwing

Species of moth

Catocala orba, the Orba underwing, is a moth of the family Erebidae. The species was first described by Nikolai Yakovlevich Kuznetsov in 1903. It is found from Massachusetts south to Georgia and Florida, west to Texas, and as far north as Mississippi.

The wingspan is 40–45 mm. Adults are on wing from June to August. There is probably one generation per year.

The larvae probably feed on hickory and walnut.
