= Gallerites =

Scientific classification
- Domain: Eukaryota
- Kingdom: Animalia
- Phylum: Arthropoda
- Class: Insecta
- Order: Lepidoptera
- Family: Pyralidae
- Genus: †Gallerites; Kernbach, 1967
- Species: †G. keleri

Binomial name
- †Gallerites keleri Kernbach, 1967

Extinct genus of moths

Gallerites is an extinct genus of snout moths. It was described by Kernbach in 1967, and contains the species Gallerites keleri which is known from the Pliocene. The species was discovered in Willershausen in Germany.
