= Kalefeld =

- Municipality
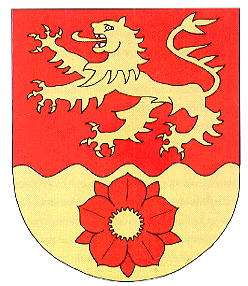
- Coat of arms

- Location of Kalefeld within Northeim district
- Interactive map of Kalefeld
- Location within Germany Location within Lower Saxony
- Coordinates: 51°47′53″N 10°02′06″E
- Country: Germany
- State: Lower Saxony
- District: Northeim

Government
  - Mayor (2021–26): Jens Meyer (SPD)

Area
  - Total: 84.2 km^{2} (32.5 sq mi)
- Elevation: 125 m (410 ft)

Population (2025-12-31)
  - Total: 5,664
  - Density: 67.3/km^{2} (174/sq mi)
- Time zone: UTC+01:00 (CET)
  - Summer (DST): UTC+02:00 (CEST)
- Postal codes: 37589
- Dialling codes: 05553
- Vehicle registration: NOM
- Website: www.kalefeld.de

Kalefeld (German pronunciation: [ˈkaːləfɛlt]) is a municipality in the district of Northeim, in Lower Saxony, Germany. It is situated approximately 10 km north of Northeim. It comprises the villages of Dögerode, Eboldshausen, Echte, Kalefeld, Oldenrode, Oldershausen, Sebexen, Westerhof, Wiershausen, and Willershausen.

In 2008, a Roman battlefield was excavated near the town. Currently it is very probable that Roman legionaries won a battle for a blocked pass against local Germanic fighters.

== Roman Battlefield of the early 3rd Century AD ==
In summer 2008 German archaeologists unearthed the remains of a battle fought in Magna Germania very probably between Roman legionaries and Germanic tribes. The archaeological find was originally made in 2000 by amateurs in a hilly pine-wooded region between Hanover and Kassel who discovered metallic items using metal-detectors.

The archaeologists have now ascertained that a fierce battle now called the Battle at the Harzhorn took place on the approach to a pass, involving archers and cavalry equipped with long-range catapults (Scorpio) capable of piercing shields at a distance of 300 metres (328 yards).

"The findings show that possibly 1,000 Romans were involved" in the battle, according to the leading archaeologist, Petra Lönne. "This is an unrivalled, well-preserved site," she added. Some 600 artefacts have been found so far, including spears, arrowheads, axes, armour plating, tent pegs, catapult bolts, and coins. In 2013, a complete coat of mail was discovered as well.

One such coin depicts the Roman emperor Commodus, who reigned from 180 to 192 AD (terminus post quem), while fragments of swords and carts suggest the battle took place in the first half of the third century AD

Contrary to the belief of the German media that the Romans completely retreated behind the river Rhine in the wake of the Teutoburg Forest massacre in which thousands of legionaries were slaughtered, historical records regularly reported about military operations as punitive raids east of the Rhine.

Such military operations are reported for the time of Caracalla and Maximinus Thrax, the first Roman soldier-emperor who reigned briefly from 235 to 238, was personally involved in operations against the Germanic tribes.

In April 2009 the responsible archaeologists presented six newly found silver denarii: one of Caracalla, three of Elagabalus, and two of Severus Alexander. The new discovery narrows the date of the battle down to between 230 AD and 235 AD.

Since January 2012, one of the units participating in the Roman battle is known as well: A Roman engineer's axe (dolabra) found on the battlefield is inscribed with LEG IIII (4th Legion) and further letters that reveal that its owner belonged to the Legio Quarta Flavia Severianan Alexandrina, which was stationed in Singidunum (now Belgrade, Serbia).

== Churches ==
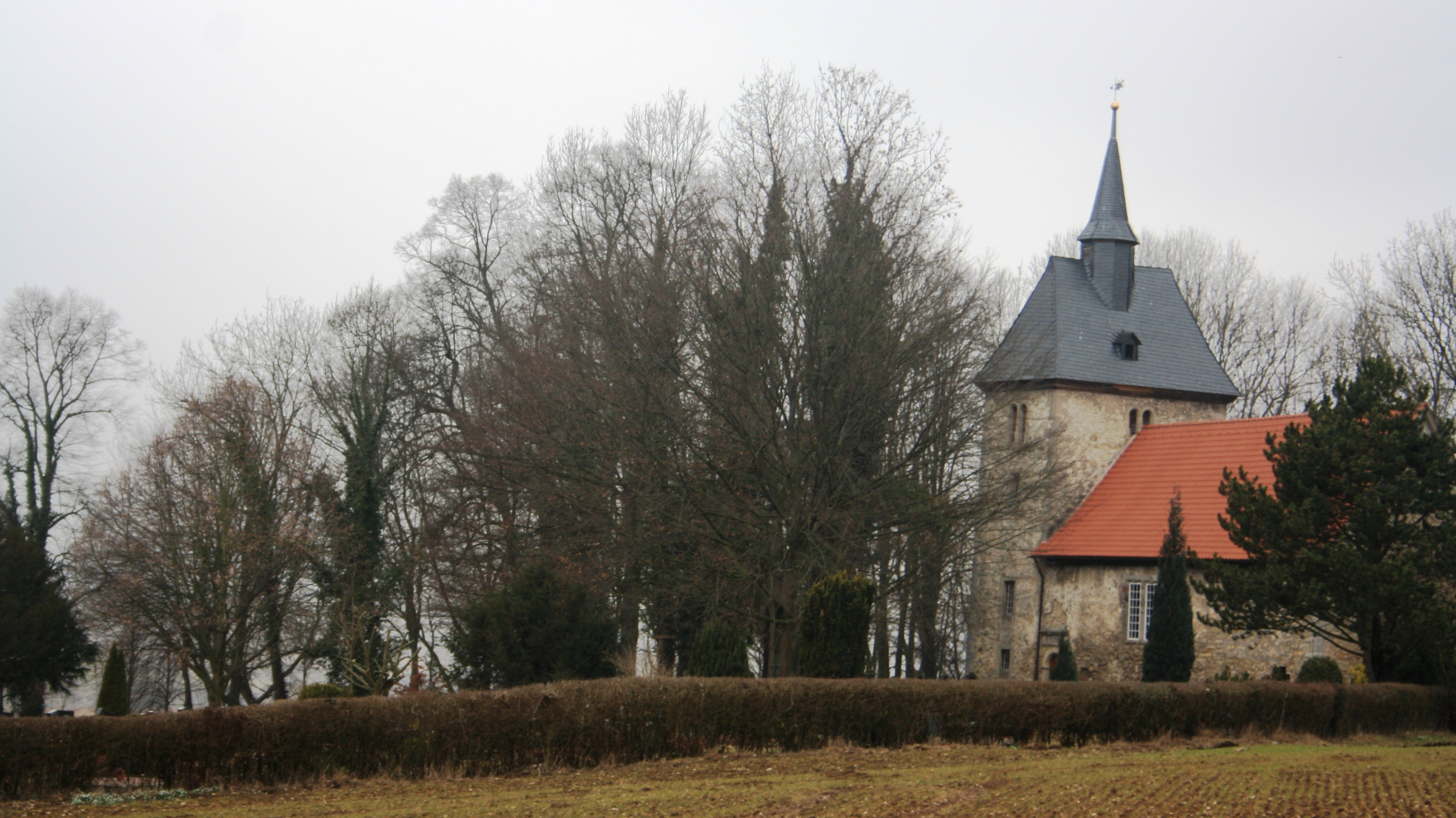
Weissenwasserkirche

- Weissenwasserkirche, built in 1145, romanesque architecture
- Liebfrauenkirche, built in 1872 with construction plans by Conrad Wilhelm Hase
