= Protolepis =

Protolepis Temporal range: Upper Jurassic

Scientific classification
- Kingdom: Animalia
- Phylum: Arthropoda
- Clade: Pancrustacea
- Class: Insecta
- Order: Lepidoptera
- Family: incertae sedis
- Genus: †Protolepis; Kozlov, 1989

Type species
- †Protolepis cuprealata Kozlov, 1989

Extinct genus of butterflies

Protolepis is an extinct genus of butterfly from the Upper Jurassic of Karatau, Kazakhstan. It contains only one species, Protolepis cuprealata. Its family and superfamily placement is uncertain.

== See also ==
- Prehistoric Lepidoptera
