= Battle at the Harzhorn =

Battle between Roman and Germanic troops (c.235)

Coordinates: 51°49′59.3″N 10°4′0.6″E

- Part of the Crisis of the Third Century and Roman–Germanic Wars
- Alleged military route of the Romans
Date	c. 235
Location	modern Lower Saxony, Germany
Result	Roman victory

Belligerents
Roman Empire	Germanic tribes

Commanders and leaders
Maximinus Thrax	Unknown

Strength
9,000	Unknown

Casualties and losses
Unknown	Unknown

The Battle at the Harzhorn took place in the early 3rd century between Germanic and Roman troops near the Harzhorn hill between the towns of Kalefeld and Bad Gandersheim, in the state of Lower Saxony, Germany.

The battlefield, spanning several square kilometers, was discovered in December 2008 and is currently being excavated. Roman coinage found at the site gives a probable date of the battle during the reign of one of two Roman emperors: Severus Alexander (222–235) or Maximinus Thrax (235–238).

Archaeologists view the battlefield as a discovery of extraordinary scientific importance. Along with the Kalkriese battlefield and the Roman camps of Bentumersiel and Hedemünden, this is one of the very few Roman archaeological sites in northern Germany.

== Historical context ==
Coinage of the Roman emperors Caracalla (211 to 217) and Severus Alexander dates the battle to the 2nd quarter of the 3rd century AD. This places the battle at the junction between the reign of the Severan emperors and the beginning of the Crisis of the 3rd century.

=== Severan emperors ===
The Roman Empire was governed by the Severan dynasty of emperors from 193 to 235. The reign of the Severan emperors is seen as a last phase of relative stability before the tumultuous era of the barracks emperors and the Crisis of the 3rd century.

=== Crisis of the 3rd century ===
The murder of the last Severan emperor Severus Alexander and the ascension of Maximinus Thrax, a praefectus legionis of Thracian origin, to the purple, mark the epoch event of the Crisis of the 3rd century. Over the next 40 years, the Roman Empire would be ruled by some 20 to 25 claimants to the imperial throne, invaded by many foreign enemies (among them the Alamanni, the Goths, and the Vandals), and even split into three competing empires.

== Battle ==
The archaeologists responsible for the excavation believe that the about 1500 artifacts found at the battle site are associated with Roman legionaries. Only one spearhead and a few arrowheads can be certainly identified as Germanic. Since Germanic tribes of the time were also sometimes equipped with Roman weaponry, one early assumption was that this could have been an inter-Germanic battle. Other Germanic excavations of the time reveal that many such conflicts were fought during the 3rd century. The finding of many bolts associated with the scorpio or cheiroballistra, which were exclusively used by Roman legions, prove, according to the scientists involved, that this battle involved a larger number of Roman troops.

The working hypothesis of the scientists is that the Roman troops were on their way back from the North German Plain. They found the Harzhorn pass blocked by a large number of Germans, and had to fight their way through, using their superior Roman artillery. The finds indicate a Roman success, due to their superior military technology.

== Battlefield today ==
=== Discovery ===
In 2000, two amateur archeologist using metal detectors discovered several artifacts at the Harzhorn while searching for a medieval fortress. When one of the artifacts they unearthed turned out to be a Roman hippo sandal, they notified the Northeim county archaeologist, who is responsible for this area.

=== Location ===
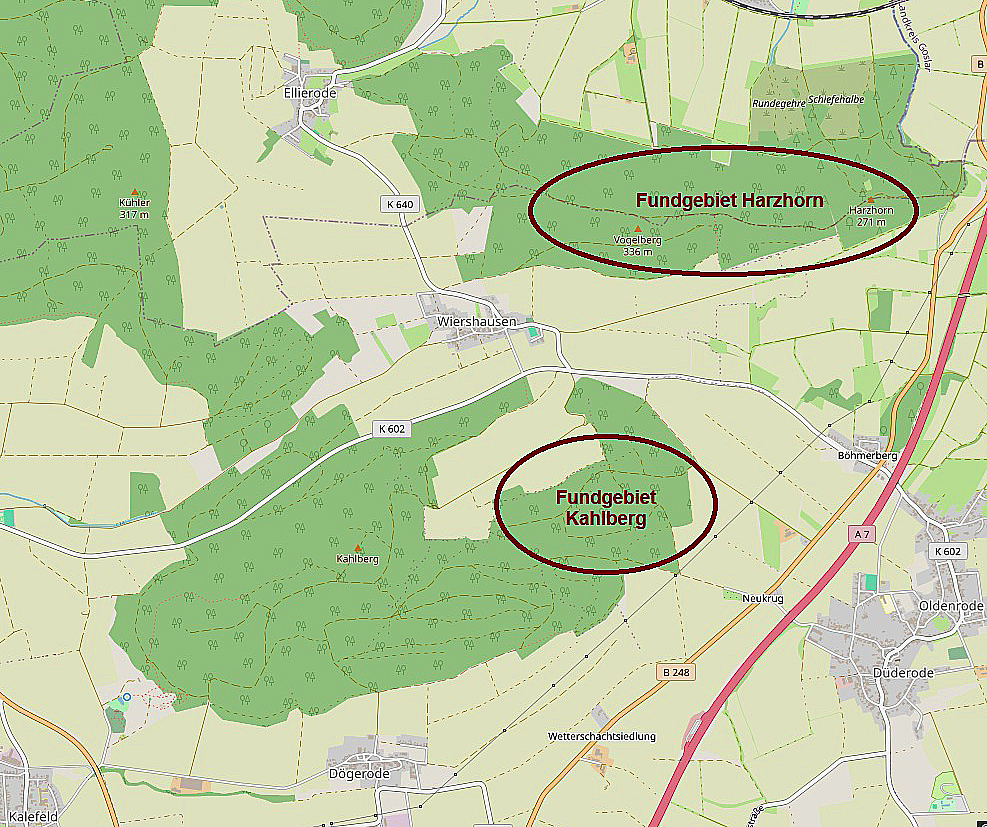
Location of the battlefield

The battlefield lies on the eastern edge of a hill range running east-to-west from the Harz mountains. In the north–south direction, it can only be crossed on a narrow pass, which is part of an ancient trade route, and today occupied by the Bundesautobahn 7.

=== Dating ===
There is no explicit date for the battle. A coin minted under and showing the portrait of Emperor Commodus and some specific pieces of military equipment originally dated the battle to after 180 AD. A hypothesis suggested the early 3rd century, such as the supposed Germanic campaigns of Emperors Caracalla and Maximinus Thrax. Both of these are attested in historical sources, but no archaeological proof had been found so far.

Later coinage finds depicting Emperors Elagabalus (218–222) and Severus Alexander (222–235) further suggests Maximinus Thrax's campaigns. The generally unreliable Historia Augusta, a late Roman collection of biographies of the Roman Emperors, mentions that Maximinus Thrax marched north from Moguntiacum (today's Mainz) about 300 (trecenta) to 400 (quadringenta) Roman miles. Since this was thought to be impossible, this passage was often changed to triginta and quadraginta (30 to 40 miles).

Numismatist Frank Berger dates the battle to between 230 and 235.

Germanic tribes had crossed the Rhine and devastated the Roman countryside in 233; in 235, Maximinus Thrax led a campaign of revenge into Germania, which had been prepared by his predecessor, Severus Alexander.

The artifacts are not from the pass itself, but from the Harzhorn hill, which lies directly west of it. The cliffs immediately north of here are very steep and almost impassible, making it an ideal ambush point.

== Conclusions ==
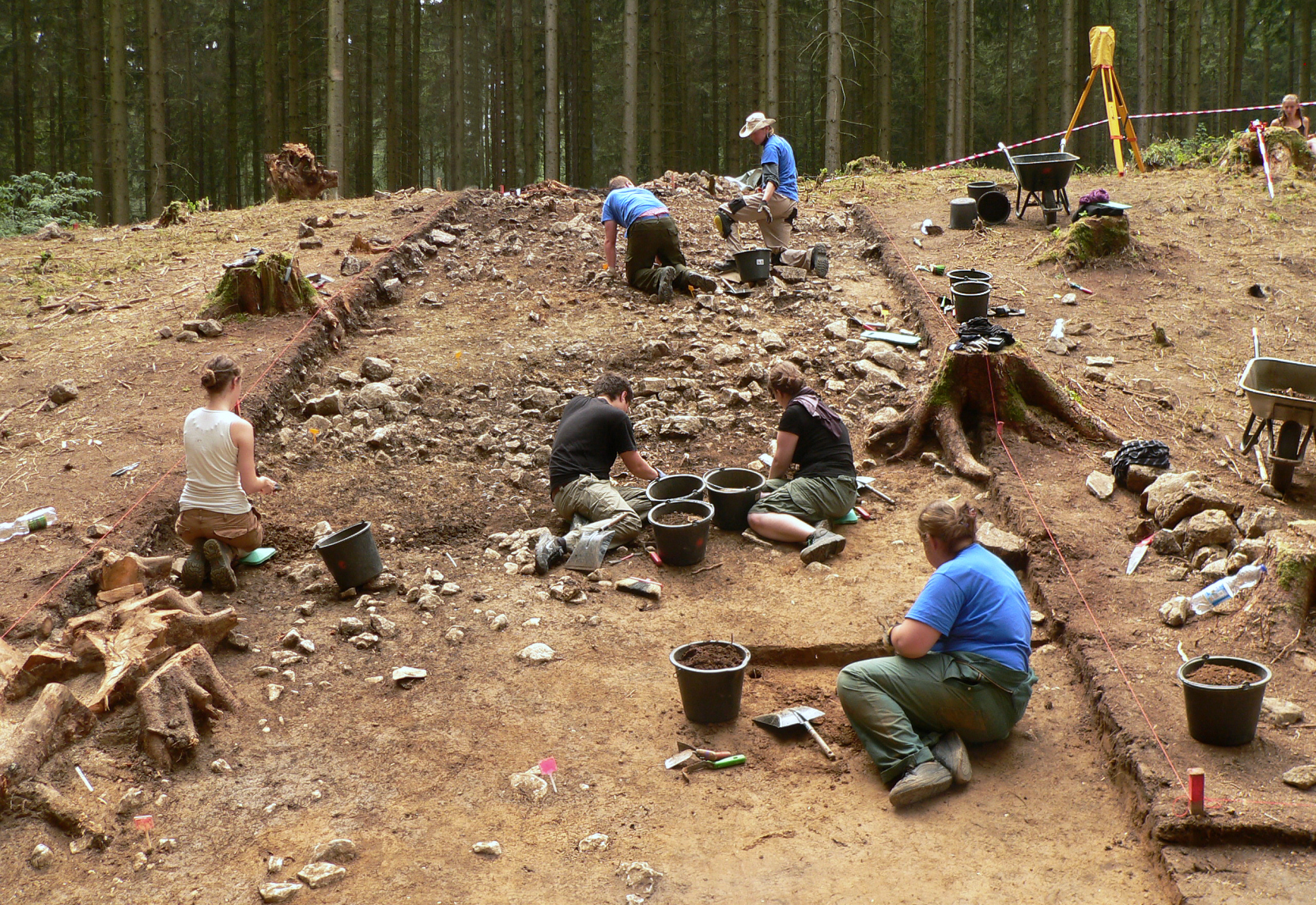
Excavations at the Harzhorn

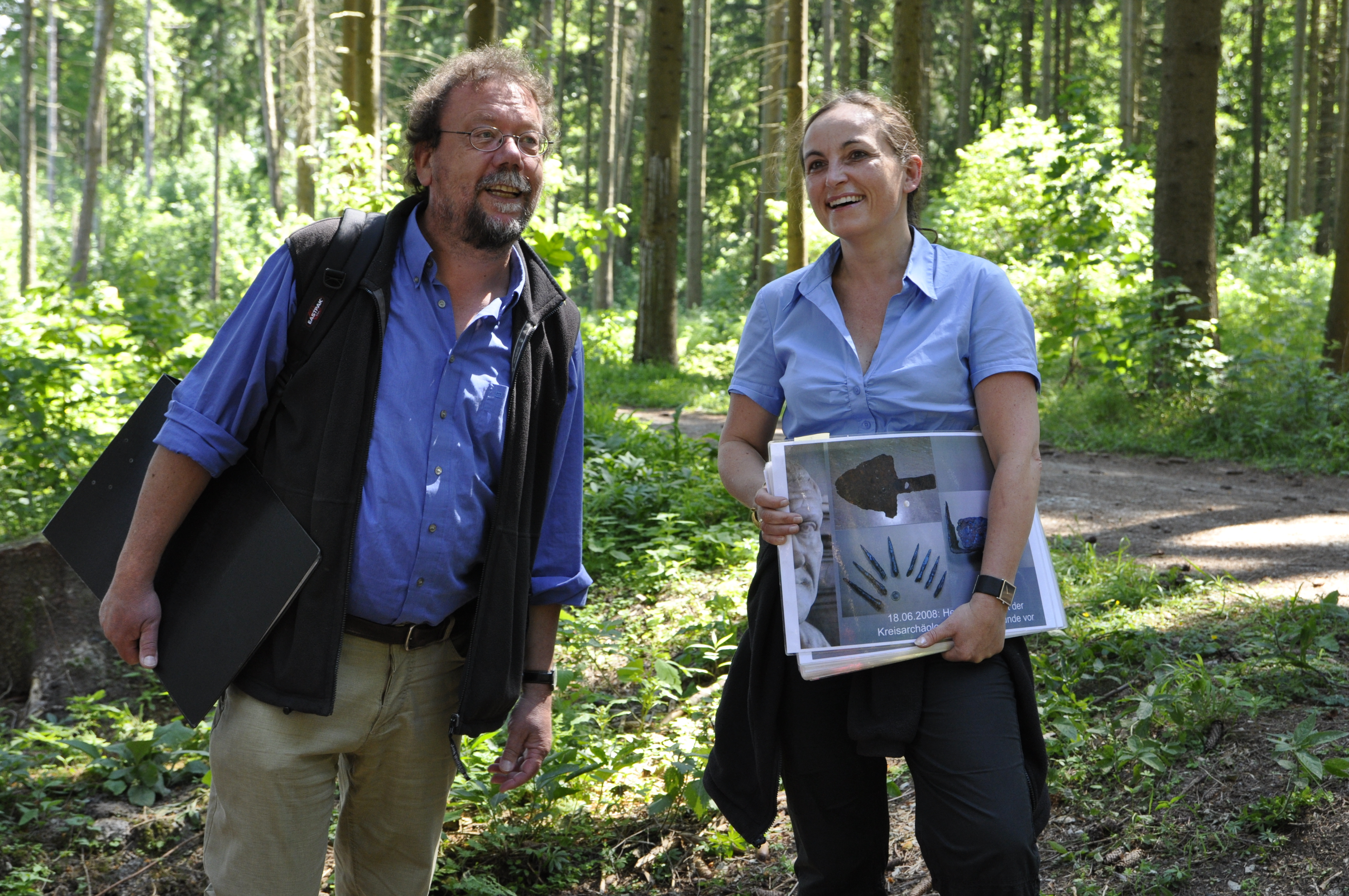
Head archaeologists Michael Geschwinde and Petra Lönne leading a group of interested people through the battlefield

=== Sources ===
Roman sources tell of larger campaigns east of the Rhine and north of the Danube during the 3rd century, especially for the reigns of emperors Caracalla (in the year 213) and Maximinus Thrax (in the year 235). While this has been known to historians for a long time, there was never any archaeological proof of any campaign during this time within the Magna Germania.

The sources are unclear on the extent of such military operations. It was assumed that they took place near the limes. The few sources that suggested otherwise were assumed to be unreliable.

The Battle at the Harzhorn, as interpreted by the artifacts found to date, now proves that the Romans went far deeper into Germania during the 3rd century than was thought possible earlier.

== Historical consequences ==
The events on the Harzhorn took place some 200 years after the Battle of the Teutoburg Forest and the campaigns of Germanicus (until 16 AD). These campaigns mark the end of Rome trying to conquer the lands between Rhine and Elbe and make them part of the Roman empire. In the following years, the Romans expanded their border fortifications to include parts of Germania, and shorten their lines of defense. This integrated the Agri decumates into the empire. However, campaigns deep into northern Germania were not known after this. The Battle at the Harzhorn is archaeological proof that they did nonetheless exist.

== References and further reading ==
- Ulrike Biehounek: Die Revanche der Römer. In: Bild der Wissenschaft. Heft 6, 2010, pp. 84–89.
- Michael Geschwinde u. a.: Roms vergessener Feldzug. In: 2000 Jahre Varusschlacht. Konflikt. Published by Museum und Park Kalkriese. Theiss, Stuttgart 2009, pp. 228 .
- Gustav Adolf Lehmann: Imperium und Barbaricum. Neue Befunde und Erkenntnisse zu den römisch-germanischen Auseinandersetzungen im nordwestdeutschen Raum – von der augusteischen Okkupationsphase bis zum Germanien-Zug des Maximinus Thrax (235 n. Chr.). Wien 2011, pp. 102 .
- Ralf-Peter Märtin: Die Rache der Römer. National Geographic, June 2010, pp. 66–93.
- "Archaeologists excavate Roman soldier's chain mail". Heritage Daily. September 10, 2013.
- Michael Geschwinde, Michael Meyer, Petra Lönne, Torben Schatte: Harzhorn. Die Archäologie eines germanisch-römischen Kampfplatzes des 3. Jahrhundert n. Chr. (= Römisch-Germanische Forschungen. Volume 77). 3 volumes, Reichert, Wiesbaden 2025
