= List of extinct butterflies =

Some other extinct butterflies are prehistoric. See prehistoric butterflies.

This is a list of recently extinct butterflies, their former ranges, and dates of extinction.

== Extinct species ==
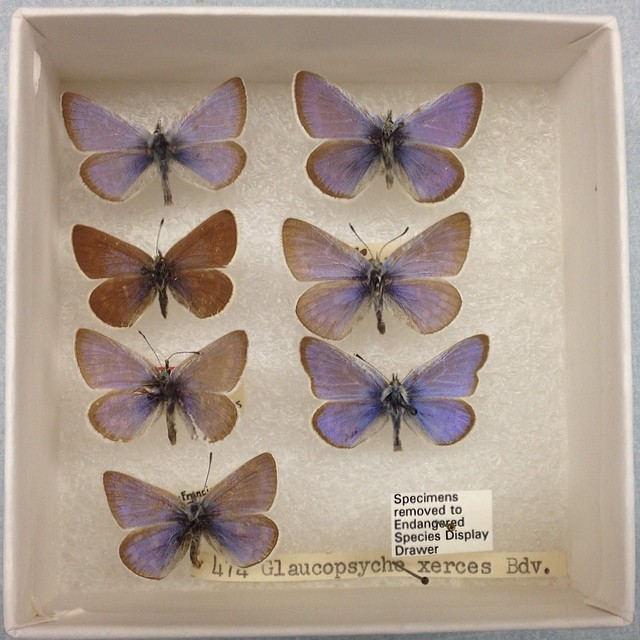
Specimens of the extinct Xerces blue in the collection of the Field Museum of Natural History

=== Nymphalidae ===
- Libythea cinyras (Mauritius, 1866)

=== Lycaenidae ===
- Mbashe River buff, Deloneura immaculata (South Africa)
- Morant's blue, Lepidochrysops hypopolia (South Africa, 1879)
- Xerces blue, Glaucopsyche xerces (United States, 1941)

=== Uraniidae ===
- Urania sloanus (Jamaica, c. 1894-1908)

== Extinct subspecies ==
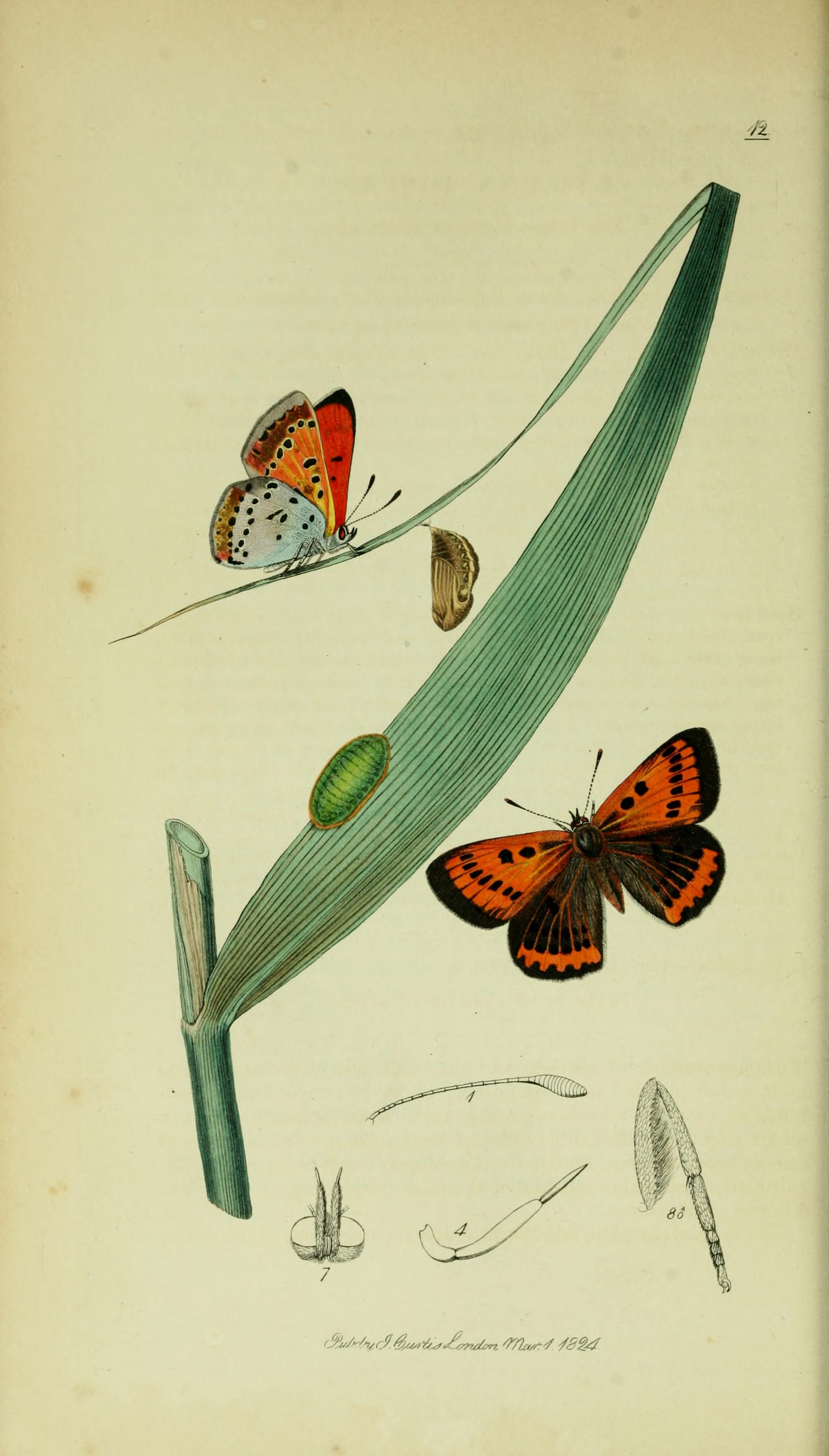
The life cycle of the extinct British large copper in an illustration from British Entomology (1828) by John Curtis.

=== Hesperiidae ===
- Florida zestos skipper, Epargyreus zestos oberon (United States)
- Rockland Meske's skipper, Hesperia meskei pinocayo (United States)

=== Papilionidae ===
- Polydamas swallowtail, Battus polydamas antiquus (Antigua and Barbuda, 1770)
- Parnassius clodius strohbeeni (United States)
- Danish clouded Apollo, Parnassius mnemosyne bang-haasi (Denmark)

=== Nymphalidae ===
- Unsilvered fritillary, Speyeria adiaste atossa (United States)

=== Lycaenidae ===
- British large copper, Lycaena dispar dispar (England, 1864)
- Scarce large blue, Phengaris teleius burdigalensis (France)
- Dutch Alcon blue, Phengaris alcon arenaria (Netherlands, 1979)

== See also ==
- Prehistoric butterflies
