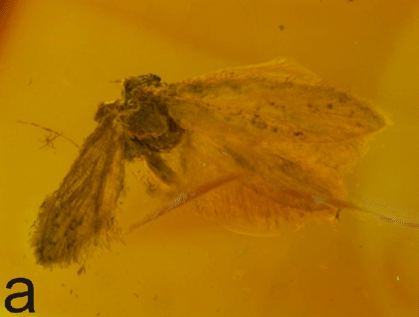
- Holotype in Baltic amber

Scientific classification
- Kingdom: Animalia
- Phylum: Arthropoda
- Class: Insecta
- Order: Lepidoptera
- Family: Tortricidae
- Subfamily: Tortricinae
- Tribe: Sparganothini
- Genus: †Spatalistiforma; Skalski, 1992
- Species: †S. submerga

Binomial name
- †Spatalistiforma submerga Skalski, 1992

= Spatalistiforma =

Monotypic genus of tortrix moths

Spatalistiforma is an extinct genus of moths belonging to the family Tortricidae. It contains only one species, Spatalistiforma submerga, which was described from Baltic amber.
