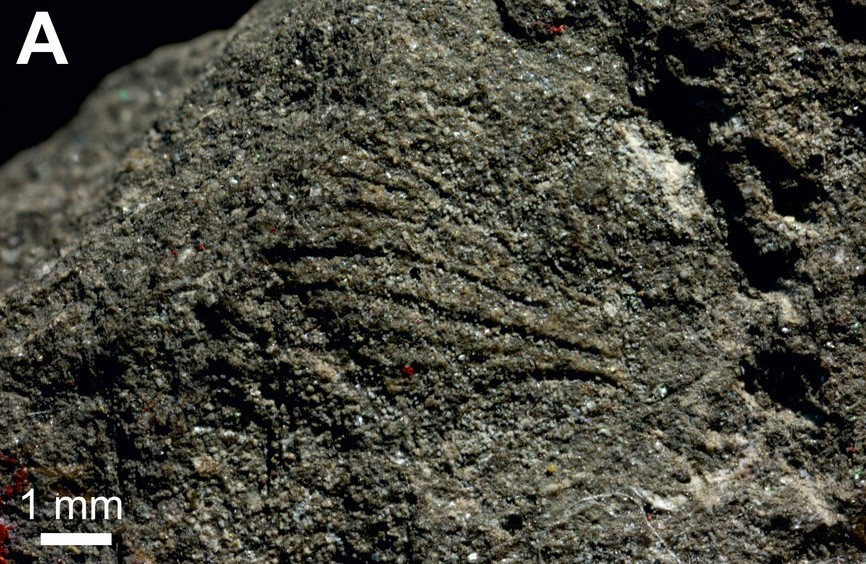

Scientific classification
- Kingdom: Animalia
- Phylum: Arthropoda
- Clade: Pancrustacea
- Class: Insecta
- Order: Lepidoptera
- Family: Hepialidae
- Genus: †Protohepialus; Pierce, 1945
- Species: †P. comstocki

Binomial name
- †Protohepialus comstocki Pierce, 1945

= Protohepialus =

Single-species extinct genus of moths

Protohepialus is an extinct genus of moth in the family Hepialidae. It contains only one species, Protohepialus comstocki, which was described from a Tortonian marine shale (Upper Miocene) in the Puente Formation of California. The species name comstocki was given in honor of John Adams Comstock, the Head Curator of Science at the Natural History Museum of Los Angeles County.

The holotype specimen is a compression fossil of a partial wing about 5mm in width by 5mm in height. Since its description, doubts have been raised over whether the fossil is a Hepialid, or even a Lepidopteran at all. Specifically, the relief of the veins are too deep, the width of the veins are too large for its small size, and some of the interpreted veins do not appear typical for an insect wing.
