= Elachistites =

Scientific classification
- Kingdom: Animalia
- Phylum: Arthropoda
- Class: Insecta
- Order: Lepidoptera
- Family: Elachistidae
- Genus: †Elachistites; Kozlov, 1987

Species
- †Elachistites inclusus Kozlov, 1987; †Elachistites sukatshevae Kozlov, 1987

Extinct genus of moths

Elachistites is an extinct genus of moth in the family Elachistidae. It contains several species described from Baltic amber.
