= Electrocrania =

Electrocrania Temporal range: Eocene

Scientific classification
- Domain: Eukaryota
- Kingdom: Animalia
- Phylum: Arthropoda
- Class: Insecta
- Order: Lepidoptera
- Family: Micropterigidae
- Genus: †Electrocrania; Kuznetsov, 1941

Species
- †Electrocrania immensipalpa, Kuznetsov 1941; †Electrocrania michalskii, Kurz 2015

Extinct genus of moths

Electrocrania is an extinct genus of micropterigid moth. It is known from two species found in Eocene aged Baltic amber. The genus was originally described by Nikolai Yakovlevich Kuznetsov in 1941. The genus was subsequently synonymised with Micropterix, until a second species was described in 2015, which restored it as a distinct genus.
