= Mioclanis =

Scientific classification
- Domain: Eukaryota
- Kingdom: Animalia
- Phylum: Arthropoda
- Class: Insecta
- Order: Lepidoptera
- Family: Sphingidae
- Genus: †Mioclanis; Zhang, Sun & Zhang, 1994
- Species: †M. shanwangiana

Binomial name
- †Mioclanis shanwangiana Zhang, Sun & Zhang, 1994

Single-species extinct genus of moths

Mioclanis is an extinct genus of moths in the family Sphingidae, containing one species Mioclanis shanwangiana which is known from Shandong in China. It is dated to the Middle Miocene, approximately 15 to 17 Myr.
