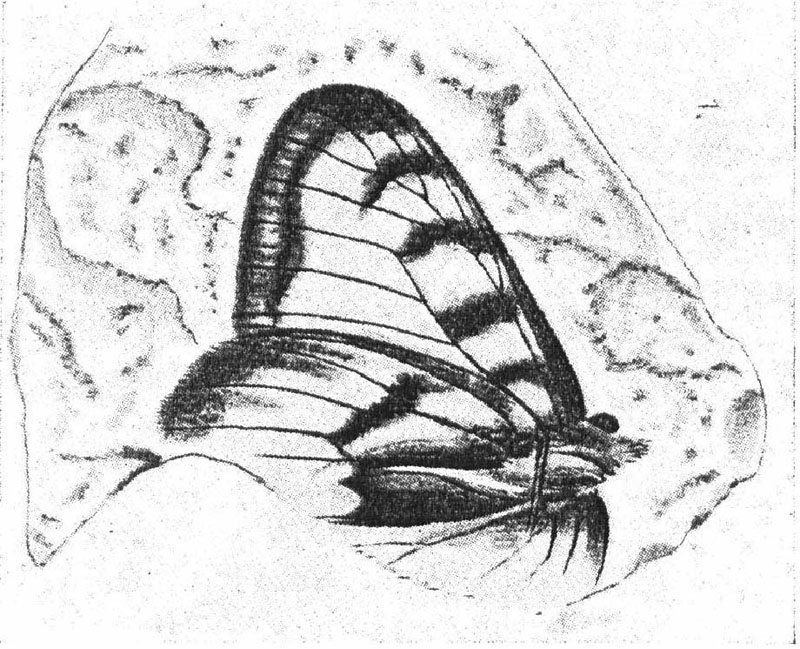

Scientific classification
- Kingdom: Animalia
- Phylum: Arthropoda
- Class: Insecta
- Order: Lepidoptera
- Family: Papilionidae
- Genus: †Doritites; Rebel, 1898
- Species: †D. bosniaskii

Binomial name
- †Doritites bosniaskii Rebel, 1898

= Doritites =

Extinct genus of butterflies

Doritites bosniaskii is a fossil swallowtail butterfly in the subfamily Parnassiinae. It was described by Rebel in 1898. The genus and its sole species were described from the Miocene of Tuscany, Italy.

The fossil shows light and dark bands of scales on the wings, and traces on the rock near the fossil have been interpreted as showing pamassiine-like wing characters, but could also be rock artifacts.

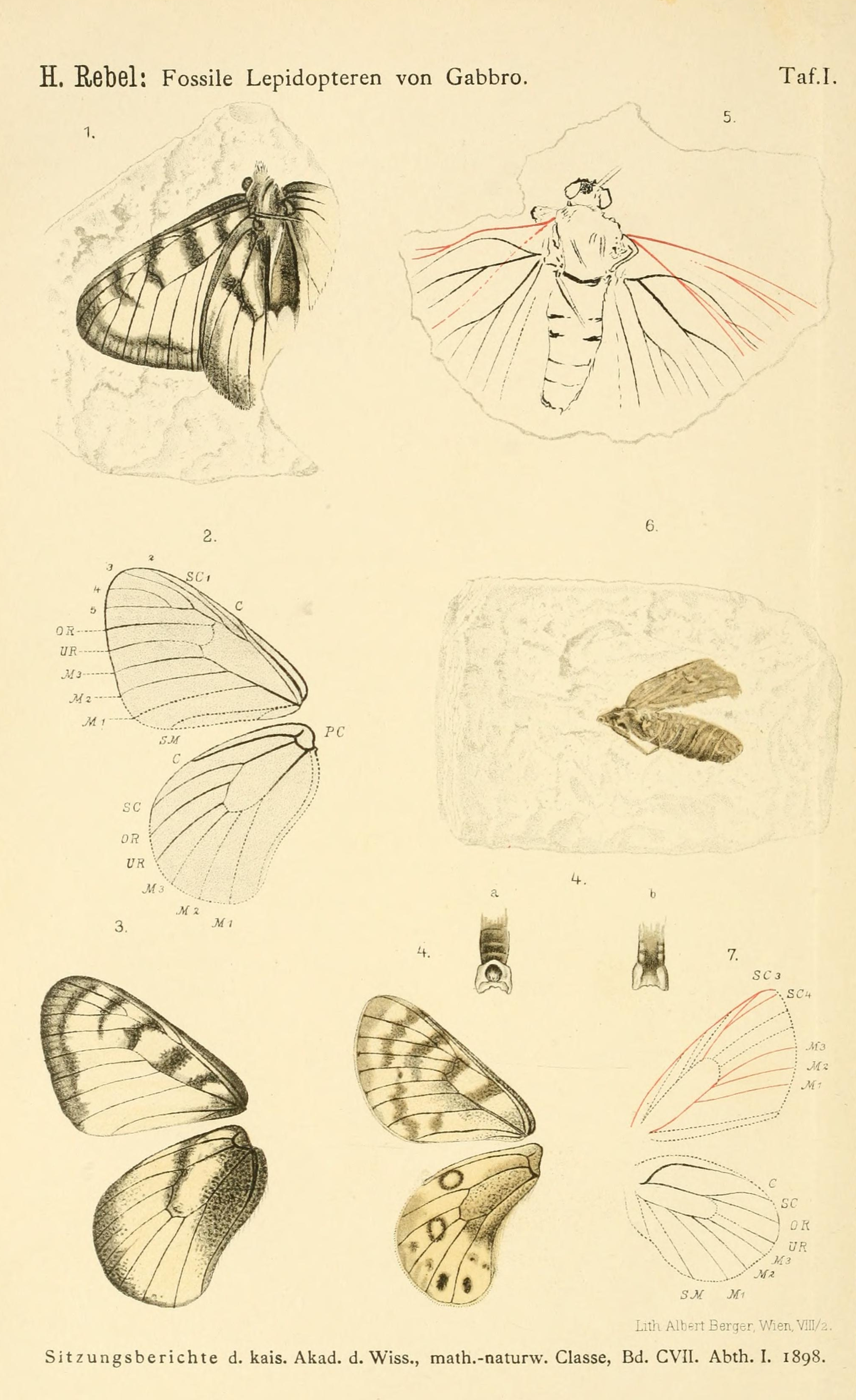
Rebel's reconstruction

== Other sources ==
- Hancock, D.L., 1983. Classification of the Papilionidae (Lepidoptera): a phylogenetic approach. Smithersia 2: 1-48.
- Nazari, V., Zakharov, E.V., Sperling, F.A.H., 2007. Phylogeny, historical biogeography, and taxonomic ranking of Parnassiinae (Lepidoptera, Papilionidae) based on morphology and seven genes. Molecular Phylogenetics and Evolution, 42: 131–156.
