= Epinomeuta =

Scientific classification
- Kingdom: Animalia
- Phylum: Arthropoda
- Class: Insecta
- Order: Lepidoptera
- Family: Yponomeutidae
- Genus: Epinomeuta

Species
- See text

Genus of moths

Epinomeuta is a genus of moths of the family Yponomeutidae.

== Species ==
- Epinomeuta acutipennella - Rebel, 1935
- Epinomeuta inversella - Rebel, 1935
- Epinomeuta minorella - Rebel, 1935
- Epinomeuta truncatipennella - Rebel, 1935
