= Adelopsyche =

Scientific classification
- Kingdom: Animalia
- Phylum: Arthropoda
- Clade: Pancrustacea
- Class: Insecta
- Order: Lepidoptera
- Family: Psychidae
- Genus: †Adelopsyche; Cockerell, 1926
- Species: †A. frustrans

Binomial name
- †Adelopsyche frustrans Cockerell, 1926

Extinct genus of moths

Adelopsyche is an extinct genus of moths in the family Psychidae. The single species, Adelopsyche frustrans, was found in the Florissant Fossil Beds National Monument in Colorado, United States. The fossil is dated to the Late Eocene.
