= Palaeosabatinca =

Scientific classification
- Kingdom: Animalia
- Phylum: Arthropoda
- Clade: Pancrustacea
- Class: Insecta
- Order: Lepidoptera
- Family: Micropterigidae
- Genus: †Palaeosabatinca; Kozlov, 1989
- Species: †P. zherichini

Binomial name
- †Palaeosabatinca zherichini Kozlov, 1988

Extinct genus of moths

Palaeosabatinca is an extinct genus of small primitive metallic moths within the family Micropterigidae, containing one species, Palaeosabatinca zherichini. It is known from Russia. The fossil remains are dated to the Lower Cretaceous.
