= Noctuites =

Scientific classification
- Kingdom: Animalia
- Phylum: Arthropoda
- Class: Insecta
- Order: Lepidoptera
- Superfamily: Noctuoidea
- Genus: †Noctuites; Heer, 1849

Synonyms
- Xyleutites Kozhanchikov, 1957

Extinct genus of moths

Noctuites is a genus of extinct moths in the Noctuoidea superfamily. This genus was originally designated to accommodate noctuids of uncertain association. Most noctuoid fossils are incomplete, making them hard to place in a modern phylogeny of Noctuoidea. For this reason the genus has not been assigned to a family.

== Species ==
- †Noctuites caucasicus Kozlov, 1988, described from the Stavropol Territory of Russia and dated to the Middle Miocene.
- †Noctuites deperditus Heer, 1856, described from Aix-en-Provence in France and dated to the Late Oligocene–Early Miocene boundary.
- †Noctuites effosus Heer, 1849 (= Noctuites effossus Handlirsch, 1908), described from Croatia and dated to the Early Miocene.
- †Noctuites gersdorfi Kernbach, 1967, described from Germany and dated to the Late Pliocene.
- †Noctuites haidingeri Heer, 1849, described from Croatia and dated to the Early Miocene.
- †Noctuites incertissimus Oustalet, 1870, described from France and dated to the Late Oligocene.
- †Noctuites kaspievi Kozlov, 1988, described from the Stavropol Territory of Russia and dated to the Middle Miocene.
- †Noctuites kozhantshikovi Kozlov, 1988, described from the Stavropol Territory of Russia and dated to the Middle Miocene.
- †Noctuites kusnezovi Kozlov, 1988, described from the Stavropol Territory of Russia and dated to the Middle Miocene.
- †Noctuites maximus Kozlov, 1988, described from the Stavropol Territory of Russia and dated to the Middle Miocene.
- †Noctuites miocenicus (Kozhanchikov, 1957) (described as Xyleutites miocenicus), described from the Stavropol Territory of Russia and dated to the Middle Miocene.
- †Noctuites radobojana Kozlov, 1988, described from Croatia and dated to the Early Miocene.
- †Noctuites stavropolicus Kozlov, 1988, described from the Stavropol Territory of Russia and dated to the Middle Miocene.

== Unnamed fossils ==
A further three unnamed fossil species have been assigned to this genus:

- Undescribed species Hope, 1836 (originally referred to Noctua)
- Undescribed species Kozlov, 1988, from the Stavropol Territory of Russia and dated to the Middle Miocene.
- Undescribed species Lomnicki, 1894 (originally referred to Noctua), from Ukraine and dated to the Pleistocene.
