= Mesokristensenia =

Mesokristensenia Temporal range: Middle Jurassic, 165 Ma

Scientific classification
- Kingdom: Animalia
- Phylum: Arthropoda
- Clade: Pancrustacea
- Class: Insecta
- Order: Lepidoptera
- Family: †Mesokristenseniidae; Huang, Nel & Minet, 2010
- Genus: †Mesokristensenia; Huang, Nel & Minet, 2010

Species
- †M. angustipenna Huang, Nel & Minet, 2010; †M. latipenna Huang, Nel & Minet, 2010 (type); †M. sinica Huang, Nel & Minet, 2010

Extinct genus of moths

Mesokristensenia is an extinct genus of moth in the family Mesokristenseniidae. It existed in what is now China during the middle Jurassic period. It was named by Huang Diying, André Nel and Joël Minet in 2010, and the type species is Mesokristensenia latipenna.

Three species were included when the family and genus were first described. The species were recovered from the Middle Jurassic Jiulongshan Formations Daohugou beds in Inner Mongolia). Mesokristenseniidae was suggested to possibly represent a sister group to Micropterigidae. Mesokristensenia differs from all extant Lepidoptera, except Agathiphaga, in that the forewings retain four median veins, a character shared with the lepidopteran sister order Trichoptera.
