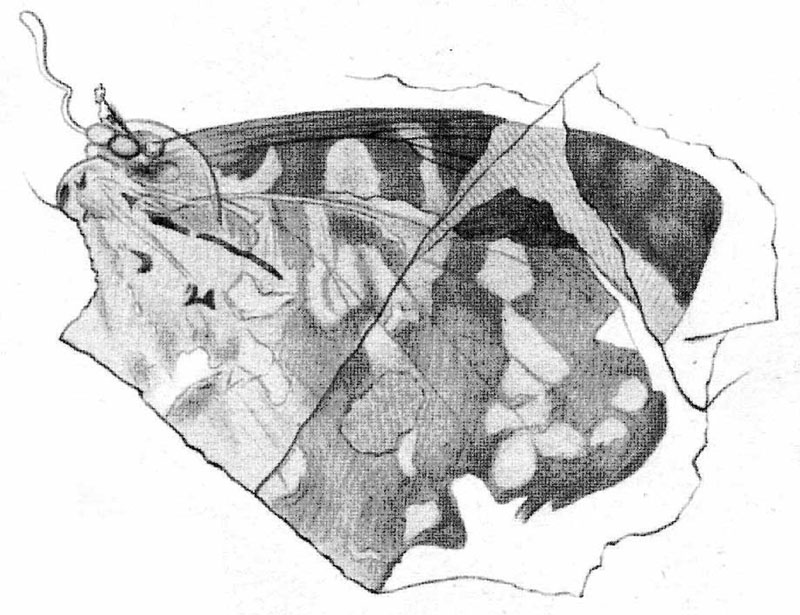
- Drawing by Scudder 1875

Scientific classification
- Kingdom: Animalia
- Phylum: Arthropoda
- Class: Insecta
- Order: Lepidoptera
- Family: Papilionidae
- Subfamily: Parnassiinae
- Genus: †Thaites; Scudder, 1875

Species
- Single species: Thaites ruminiana (Scudder 1875)

= Thaites =

Extinct genus of butterflies

Thaites ruminiana, is the only species of the extinct genus, Thaites. It was described by Samuel Hubbard Scudder in 1875, after discovery in Aix-en-Provence, Southern France. It is a fossil swallowtail butterfly.
