= Incurvarites =

Scientific classification
- Kingdom: Animalia
- Phylum: Arthropoda
- Class: Insecta
- Order: Lepidoptera
- Family: Incurvariidae
- Genus: †Incurvarites; Rebel, 1934
- Species: †I. alienella

Binomial name
- †Incurvarites alienella Rebel, 1934

Extinct genus of moths

Incurvarites is an extinct genus of moths in the family Incurvariidae. It was described by Rebel in 1934, and contains the species Incurvarites alienella. The fossil was found in Baltic amber and is dated to Lutetian, Middle Eocene.
