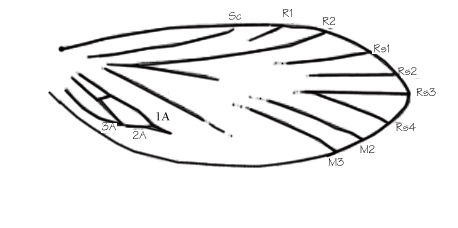
- Wing venation of Archaeolepis

Scientific classification
- Kingdom: Animalia
- Phylum: Arthropoda
- Class: Insecta
- Order: Lepidoptera
- Family: †Archaeolepidae
- Genus: †Archaeolepis; Whalley, 1985
- Species: †A. mane

Binomial name
- †Archaeolepis mane Whalley, 1985

= Archaeolepis =

Archaeolepis Temporal range: Early Jurassic, 190 Ma

Fossil insect

Archaeolepis mane is amongst the earliest undisputed lepidopteran fossils. It dates from the Lower Jurassic (ca 190 million years ago). It was found in the Charmouth Mudstone Formation, Dorset, United Kingdom.

== Etymology ==
Archaeolepis means 'ancient scale', referring to the antiquity of the specimen, and the scales (modified and flattened hairs characteristic of butterflies and moths) that identify it as a lepidopteran. The species name, A. mane means 'dawn', further emphasising that it is the earliest known member of this group.

== Taxonomy ==
Both the genus and the species were first described in 1985 by Paul Whalley.

== Discovery ==
The fossil was found by J. F. Jackson (1894–1966) of Charmouth, and later purchased by the British Museum of Natural History. The fossil of Archaeolepis was not studied until the 1980s, when it was described as a type of early lepidopteran, the family that includes butterflies and moths.

The fossil (which comprises a wing) is just over 5 mm long (0.2 inches) and 2 mm wide.

== Distribution ==
The species has been found only at Birchi Nodules, Black Ven, Charmouth.

== Significance ==
The fossil of Archaeolepis consists of wings with scales that are similar to those in lepidopterans. When it was found it pushed the known fossil range of lepidopterans back another 50 million years. This was surprising, because it had been assumed that butterflies and moths first emerged alongside flowering plants in the Cretaceous. Finding Archaeolepis in the Early Jurassic, means that the first members of this group must have originated earlier.

Similar scales to those of butterflies and moths have been found in earlier deposits from the Latest Triassic, and some researchers argue this, along with evidence from genes, provides evidence for a much earlier appearance of the group. But the identification of these fossils is disputed, so Archaeolepis remains the oldest confirmed fossil lepidopteran.
