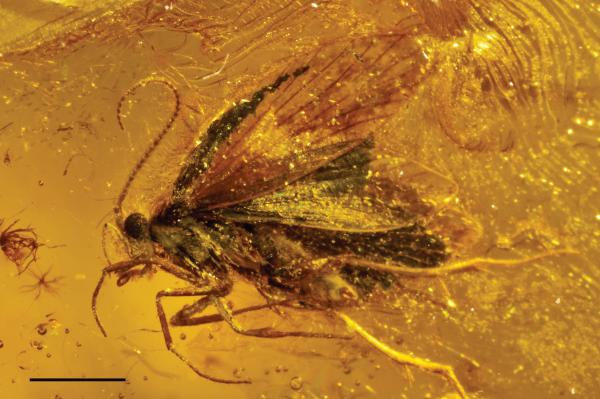
- Baltimartyria rasnitsyni

Scientific classification
- Kingdom: Animalia
- Phylum: Arthropoda
- Clade: Pancrustacea
- Class: Insecta
- Order: Lepidoptera
- Family: Micropterigidae
- Genus: †Baltimartyria; Skalski, 1995

Species
- †B. proavitella (Rebel, 1936); †B. rasnitsyni Mey, 2011

Synonyms
- Micropterix proavitella Rebel, 1936; Sabatinca proavitella

= Baltimartyria =

Baltimartyria Temporal range: early Eocene

Extinct genus of moths

Baltimartyria is an extinct genus of primitive metallic moths in the family Micropterigidae. The genus is solely known from the Early Eocene Baltic amber deposits in the Baltic Sea region of Europe. The genus currently contains two described species, Baltimartyria proavitella and Baltimartyria rasnitsyni.

== B. proavitella ==
The first known fossil was originally studied and described by Hans Rebel of the Austrian Academy of Sciences in Vienna, Austria. Rebel named the species Micropterix proavitella, thinking it belonged to the modern genus Micropterix. Rebel published his description of the species in 1936. The fossil was reexamined in 1995 by the Polish entomologist Andrzej W. Skalski, who recognized the species was not a member of Micropterix and moved the species to the new genus Baltimartyria.

== B. rasnitsyni ==
The second species of Baltimartyria described from Baltic amber is B. rasnitsyni which, like B. proavitella, is known from a single specimen. The holotype is included in the paleoentomology collections of the Museum für Naturkunde, Berlin, as specimen MB.I 5950. The holotype specimen is a complete male moth, included in a transparent section of amber with its wings partly spread. Due to the positioning of the body the right antenna and right maxillary palps are not visible, while the top and inner sides of the genitalia are partly coated in a white coating. Overall the specimen has a body length of 3 millimetres (0.12 in) and has a fore-wing length of 4 millimetres (0.16 in). B. rasnitsyni is distinguishable from B. proavitella by characters of the wing vein structure and the maxillary palps. While the R vein branches in B. proavitella all originate separately from the cell, whereas the R_{4} and R_{5} veins originate from a single vein that forks on the apex side of the cell. The species was described and named by Wolfram Mey in a 2011 paper published in the online and print journal ZooKeys. Mey notes that the type specimen had been sitting on his desk for a number of years prior to description. The generic placement was not recognized by Mey until Skalski's 1995 redescription of B. proavitella. Mey chose the specific epithet rasnitsyni to honor the eminent Russian paleoentomologist, Alexandr Pavlovich Rasnitsyn.
