= Gurnetia =

Scientific classification
- Kingdom: Animalia
- Phylum: Arthropoda
- Clade: Pancrustacea
- Class: Insecta
- Order: Lepidoptera
- Family: Cossidae
- Genus: †Gurnetia; Cockerell, 1921
- Species: †G. durranti

Binomial name
- †Gurnetia durranti Cockerell, 1921

Extinct species of moth

Gurnetia is a genus of extinct moth in the family Cossidae, and contains only one species Gurnetia durranti. It was described from a specimen found in the Bouldnor Formation on the Isle of Wight. It is dated to the Late Eocene.
