= Prolyonetia =

Scientific classification
- Kingdom: Animalia
- Phylum: Arthropoda
- Class: Insecta
- Order: Lepidoptera
- Family: Lyonetiidae
- Genus: Prolyonetia; Kuznetzov, 1941

Extinct genus of moths

Prolyonetia is an extinct genus of moths in the family Lyonetiidae. The single species Prolyonetia cockerelli Kusnetzov, 1941, has been described from Baltic amber.
