= Tortricibaltia =

Scientific classification
- Kingdom: Animalia
- Phylum: Arthropoda
- Class: Insecta
- Order: Lepidoptera
- Family: Tortricidae
- Genus: Tortricibaltia; Skalski, 1992

Genus of tortrix moths

Tortricibaltia is a genus of moths belonging to the family Tortricidae and unassigned to any subfamily or tribe.

== Species ==
- Tortricibaltia diakonoffi Skalski, 1992

== See also ==
- List of Tortricidae genera
