= Prohepialus =

Scientific classification
- Kingdom: Animalia
- Phylum: Arthropoda
- Class: Insecta
- Order: Lepidoptera
- Family: Hepialidae
- Genus: †Prohepialus; Piton, 1940
- Species: †P. incertus

Binomial name
- †Prohepialus incertus Piton, 1940

Extinct genus of moths

Prohepialus is an extinct genus of insect of uncertain phylogenetic placement. It was originally identified as a moth in the family Hepialidae; however, Simonsen, Wagner & Heikkilä (2019) considered it more likely to be a symphytan wasp. It contains only one species, Prohepialus incertus, which was described from a Thanetian crater lake diatomite (Paleocene) in Menat (Puy-de-Dôme), France. A second specimen is known from the Bembridge Marls (Eocene) in the United Kingdom.
