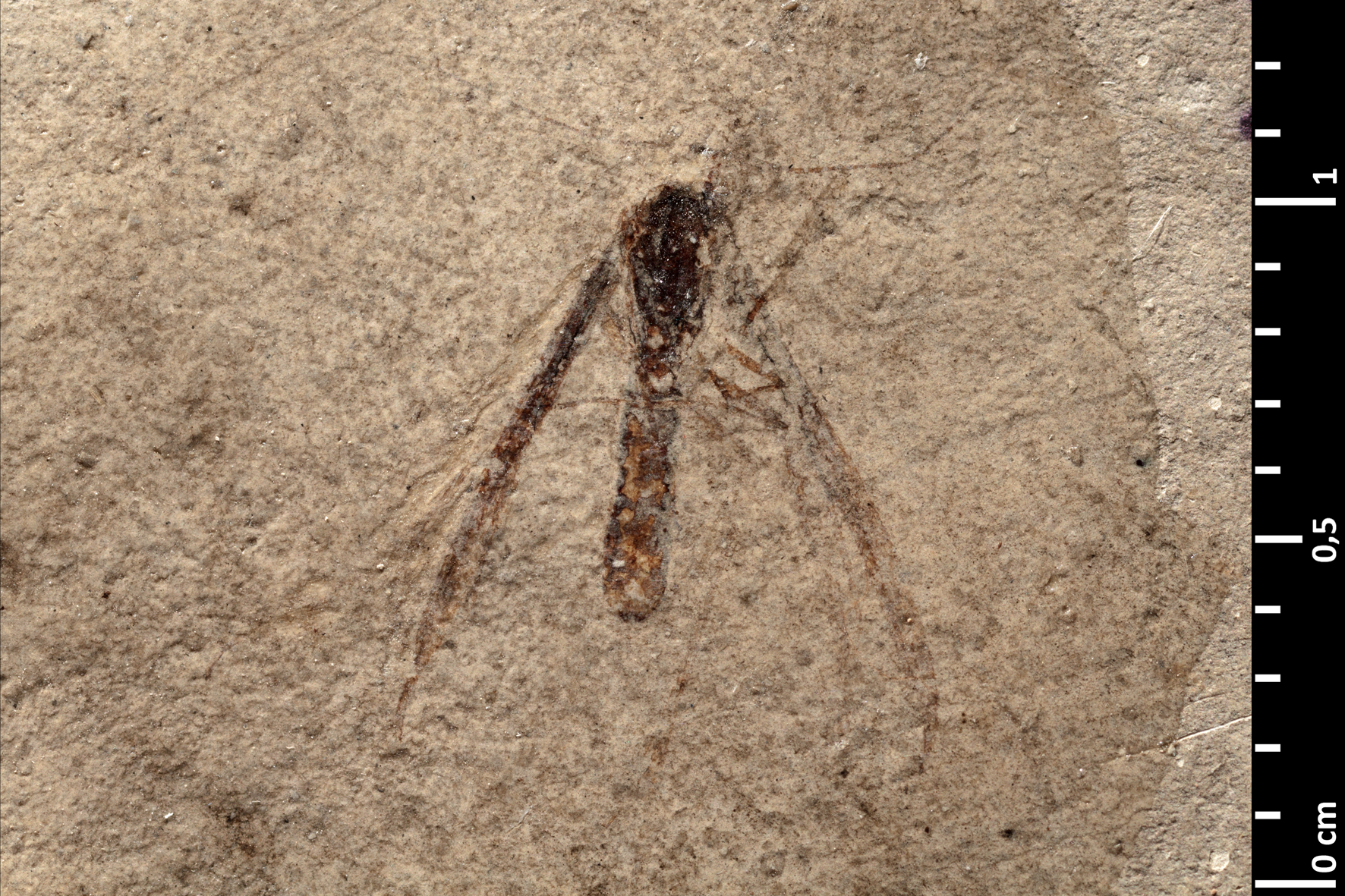
- Holotype specimen

Scientific classification
- Kingdom: Animalia
- Phylum: Arthropoda
- Clade: Pancrustacea
- Class: Insecta
- Order: Lepidoptera
- Family: Pterophoridae
- Genus: Merrifieldia
- Species: †M. oligocenicus

Binomial name
- †Merrifieldia oligocenicus (Bigot, Nel & Nel, 1986)

Synonyms
- Pterophorus oligocenicus

= Merrifieldia oligocenicus =

Sole known plume moth fossil

Merrifieldia oligocenicus (synonyms Pterophorus oligocenicus) is an extinct moth of the family Pterophoridae. It is the only known fossil of the family Pterophoridae. It was discovered in Aix-en-Provence, Bouches-du-Rhone in France. It is a late Oligocene species, dated to 25–30 million years BP.
