= Symmocites =

Scientific classification
- Kingdom: Animalia
- Phylum: Arthropoda
- Class: Insecta
- Order: Lepidoptera
- Family: Autostichidae
- Subfamily: Symmocinae
- Genus: †Symmocites; Kusnetsov, 1941
- Species: †S. rohdendorfi

Binomial name
- †Symmocites rohdendorfi Kusnetsov, 1941

Extinct genus of moths

Symmocites is an extinct moth genus in the family Autostichidae. It contains the species Symmocites rohdendorfi, which was described from Baltic amber.
