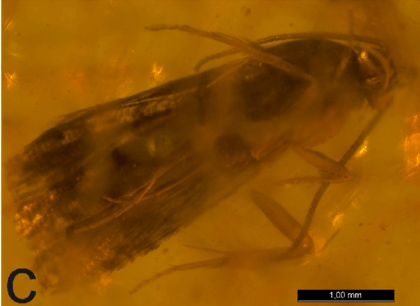
- Holotype in copal

Scientific classification
- Kingdom: Animalia
- Phylum: Arthropoda
- Class: Insecta
- Order: Lepidoptera
- Family: Tortricidae
- Subfamily: Olethreutinae
- Genus: Electresia; Kuznetzov, 1941

= Electresia =

Genus of tortrix moths

Electresia is a genus of moths belonging to the subfamily Olethreutinae of the family Tortricidae.

== Species ==
- Electresia zalesskii Kuznetzov, 1941

== See also ==
- List of Tortricidae genera
