= Stigmellites =

Scientific classification
- Kingdom: Animalia
- Phylum: Arthropoda
- Class: Insecta
- Order: Lepidoptera
- Family: Nepticulidae
- Genus: †Stigmellites; Kernbach, 1967

Species
- See text

Extinct genus of moths

Stigmellites is a genus of Lepidopteran fossils. It is only known from trace fossils of leaf mines.

== Species ==
- Stigmellites araliae (Fric, 1882) was described from a fossil mine in an Araliaceae species. It was found in the Czech Republic.
- Stigmellites baltica (Kozlov, 1988) was described from a fossil mine in Baltic amber dated to the Eocene
- Stigmellites carpini-orientalis Straus, 1977 was described from a fossil mine in Carpinus orientalis fossilis species dated to the Pliocene. It was found in Hessen, Germany.
- Stigmellites heringi Kernbach, 1967 was described from a fossil mine in a Berberis species dated to the Pliocene. It was found in Hessen, Germany.
- Stigmellites kzyldzharica (Kozlov, 1988) was described from a fossil mine in a Platanus species. It was found in Kazakhstan.
- Stigmellites messelensis Straus, 1976 was described from a fossil mine dated to the Eocene. It was found in Messel, Germany.
- Stigmellites pliotityrella Kernbach, 1967 was described from a fossil mine in Fagus silvatica dated to the Pliocene. It was found in Hessen, Germany.
- Stigmellites samsonovi Kozlov, 1988 was described from a fossil mine in Trochodendroides arctica. It was found in Kazakhstan.
- Stigmellites serpentina (Kozlov, 1988) was described from a fossil mine in Trochodendroides arctica. It was found in Kazakhstan.
- Stigmellites sharovi (Kozlov, 1988) was described from a fossil mine in Trochodendroides arctica. It was found in Kazakhstan.
- Stigmellites tyshchenkoi (Kozlov, 1988) was described from a fossil mine in Platanus latior. It was found in Kazakhstan.
- Stigmellites zelkovae Straus, 1977 was described from a fossil mine in a Zelkova species dated to the Pliocene. It was found in Hessen, Germany.
