= Oligamatites =

Scientific classification
- Domain: Eukaryota
- Kingdom: Animalia
- Phylum: Arthropoda
- Class: Insecta
- Order: Lepidoptera
- Superfamily: Noctuoidea
- Family: Erebidae
- Subfamily: Arctiinae
- Genus: †Oligamatites; Kusnetzov, 1928
- Species: †O. martynovi

Binomial name
- †Oligamatites martynovi Kusnetzov, 1928

Extinct genus of moths

Oligamatites is an extinct genus of moths in the subfamily Arctiinae. It contains the single species Oligamatites martynovi dated to the Upper Oligocene, which was described from Kazakhstan. Both the genus and species were described by Nikolai Yakovlevich Kuznetsov in 1928.
