= Dominickus =

Dominickus Temporal range: Late Eocene

Scientific classification
- Domain: Eukaryota
- Kingdom: Animalia
- Phylum: Arthropoda
- Class: Insecta
- Order: Lepidoptera
- Family: Castniidae
- Genus: †Dominickus; Tindale, 1985
- Species: †D. castnioides

Binomial name
- †Dominickus castnioides Tindale, 1985

Single-species extinct genus of moths

Dominickus is an extinct genus of moth in the butterfly-moth family Castniidae containing a single species Dominickus castnioides. The species is known from late Eocene, Priabonian stage, lake deposits near the small community of Guffey in Teller County, Colorado, United States.

== History and classification ==
Dominickus castnioides is known only from one fossil, the holotype, specimen "P.22949". It is a single, mostly complete pair of fore wings, preserved as a compression fossil in fine grained shale. The shale specimen is from the fossiliferous outcrops of the Florissant Formation which outcrop near Guffey 10 miles (16 km) southwest of Florissant. The type specimen is currently preserved in the paleoentomological collections housed in the Field Museum of Natural History, located in Chicago, Illinois, United States. Dominickus was first studied by Norman Barnett Tindale of Palo Alto, California, with his 1985 type description being published in the Journal of Research on the Lepidoptera. The generic name was coined by Tindale in honor of Richard B. Dominick. Tindale did not provide an explanation for the specific epithet castnioides.

When first examined, the specimen was thought to possibly be related to an early ancestor of Hesperioidea and Papilionoidea, due to the overall wide shape of the wings and the fork of the Cu vein being near the wing midpoint. However while Tindale was examining a series of photographs taken in Australia of live Synemon species butterfly-moths, he noticed a strong similarity between the modern moth and the Florissant fossil. Tindale then compared the fossil to the modern Chilean species Castnia psittacus which shows a closer match. The major difference between the fossil and modern members of Castniidae is the fossil's lack of a crossvein between the R_{1} and R_{2} veins.

At the time of description, the Florissant Formation was considered to be Oligocene in age. Further refinement of the formation's age using radiometric dating of sanidine crystals has resulted in an age of 34 million years old, which places the formation in the Eocene Chadronian stage. Further refinement of the Eocene-Oligocene has placed the formation into the late Eocene Priabonian stage.

== Description ==
The holotype forewings of Dominickus castnioides are about 16.4 millimetres (0.65 in) long and about 9.4 millimetres (0.37 in) wide. The wings have an overall broadly triangular shape with a rounded tip. The vein structure is very similar to that of modern Castniidae members, having an R-vein which supports the costal third of the wing. Due to the nature of the matrix in which the fossil is preserved, the wing scales of the specimen are not distinguishable or are absent. The outline of wing margin furthest from the wing base is possibly a fringe like that found in the modern members of the family. Photographs of the specimen give possible indications of the color pattering with the costal area, narrow at the wing base and widening out at the midpoint a dark tone. The base of the wing was possibly light colored with the tone extending along the hind margin.
