= Oiophassus =

Scientific classification
- Domain: Eukaryota
- Kingdom: Animalia
- Phylum: Arthropoda
- Class: Insecta
- Order: Lepidoptera
- Family: Hepialidae
- Genus: †Oiophassus; J. F. Zhang, 1989
- Species: †O. nycterus

Binomial name
- †Oiophassus nycterus J. F. Zhang, 1989

Extinct genus of moths

Oiophassus is an extinct genus of moth in the family Hepialidae. It contains only one species, Oiophassus nycterus, which was described from Shanwang Bed sw2 in the Linchu district, Shandong province in China, which is part of an Astaracian lacustrine sandstone/mudstone in the Shanwang Formation.
