= Oegoconiites =

Scientific classification
- Kingdom: Animalia
- Phylum: Arthropoda
- Class: Insecta
- Order: Lepidoptera
- Family: Autostichidae
- Subfamily: Symmocinae
- Genus: †Oegoconiites; Kusnetsov, 1941
- Species: †O. borisjaki

Binomial name
- †Oegoconiites borisjaki Kusnetsov, 1941

Extinct genus of moths

Oegoconiites is an extinct moth genus in the family Autostichidae. It contains the species Oegoconiites borisjaki, which was described from a full-body adult specimen in Baltic amber. It has been dated to the Lutetian.
