= Daiopterix =

Scientific classification
- Kingdom: Animalia
- Phylum: Arthropoda
- Clade: Pancrustacea
- Class: Insecta
- Order: Lepidoptera
- Family: †Eolepidopterigidae
- Genus: †Daiopterix; Skalski, 1984

Species
- †Daiopterix rasnitsyni Skalski, 1984; †Daiopterix olgae Kozlov, 1989

Extinct genus of moths

Daiopterix is an extinct genus of moths in the family Eolepidopterigidae.

The genus contains two species. Daiopterix rasnitsyni is known from Kazakhstan. The fossil remains date from the Jurassic. Daiopterix olgae is known from the Glushkova Formation in central Siberia. It dates from the Jurassic-Cretaceous boundary, about 145 million years ago.
