= Stauropolia =

Scientific classification
- Domain: Eukaryota
- Kingdom: Animalia
- Phylum: Arthropoda
- Class: Insecta
- Order: Lepidoptera
- Superfamily: Noctuoidea
- Family: Erebidae
- Subfamily: Arctiinae
- Genus: †Stauropolia; Skalski, 1988
- Species: †S. nekrutenkoi

Binomial name
- †Stauropolia nekrutenkoi Skalski, 1988

Extinct genus of moths

Stauropolia is an extinct genus of tiger moths in the family Erebidae. The genus includes one extinct species, Stauropolia nekrutenkoi, which lived during the Miocene epoch in Caucasus.
