= Glendotricha =

Scientific classification
- Domain: Eukaryota
- Kingdom: Animalia
- Phylum: Arthropoda
- Class: Insecta
- Order: Lepidoptera
- Family: Pyralidae
- Genus: †Glendotricha; Kusnezov, 1941
- Species: †G. olgae

Binomial name
- †Glendotricha olgae Kusnezov, 1941

Extinct genus of moths

Glendotricha is an extinct genus in the superfamily Pyraloidea. It was described by Kusnezov in 1941, and contains the species G. olgae. It is known from Baltic amber.
