= Eriocranites =

Scientific classification
- Domain: Eukaryota
- Kingdom: Animalia
- Phylum: Arthropoda
- Class: Insecta
- Order: Lepidoptera
- Family: Eriocraniidae
- Genus: †Eriocranites; Kernbach, 1967
- Species: †E. hercynicus

Binomial name
- †Eriocranites hercynicus Kernbach, 1967

Extinct genus of moths

Eriocranites is an extinct genus of moth in the family Elachistidae. It contains only one species, Eriocranites hercynicus, which was described from Willershausen in Germany. It is dated to the Pliocene.
