= Palaeolepidopterix =

Scientific classification
- Domain: Eukaryota
- Kingdom: Animalia
- Phylum: Arthropoda
- Class: Insecta
- Order: Lepidoptera
- Family: †Eolepidopterigidae
- Genus: †Palaeolepidopterix; Kozlov, 1989
- Species: †P. aurea

Binomial name
- †Palaeolepidopterix aurea Kozlov, 1989

Single-species extinct genus of moths

Palaeolepidopterix is an extinct genus of small primitive metallic moths within the extinct family Eolepidopterigidae, containing one species, Palaeolepidopterix aurea. It is known from the Late Jurassic (Oxfordian - Kimmeridgian) Karabastau Formation of Kazakhstan.
