= Prophalonia =

Scientific classification
- Domain: Eukaryota
- Kingdom: Animalia
- Phylum: Arthropoda
- Class: Insecta
- Order: Lepidoptera
- Family: Incurvariidae
- Genus: †Prophalonia; Rebel, 1936
- Species: †P. gigas

Binomial name
- †Prophalonia gigas Rebel, 1936

Extinct genus of moths

Prophalonia is an extinct genus of moths in the family Incurvariidae. It was described by Rebel in 1936, and contained the species P. acutitarsella and P. gigas. P. acutitarsellus was later transferred to Adelites.

== Taxonomy ==
Prophalonia was established in the Tortricidae and later transferred to the Tineoidea. It was included in the Incurvariidae by F. M. Carpenter in 1992.
