= Auliepterix =

Scientific classification
- Kingdom: Animalia
- Phylum: Arthropoda
- Clade: Pancrustacea
- Class: Insecta
- Order: Lepidoptera
- Family: Micropterigidae
- Genus: †Auliepterix; Kozlov, 1989

Species
- †Auliepterix minima Kozlov, 1989; †Auliepterix mirabilis Kozlov, 1989

Extinct genus of moths

Auliepterix is an extinct genus of small primitive metallic moths within the family Micropterigidae. The genus is represented by two species, the type species A. mirabilis in the Karabastau Svita of the Upper Jurassic of Kazakhstan (near Aulye) and Auliepterix minima in Upper Jurassic-Lower Cretaceous rocks near Khotont Somon in the Mongolian People's Republic.
