= Gracillariites =

Scientific classification
- Kingdom: Animalia
- Phylum: Arthropoda
- Class: Insecta
- Order: Lepidoptera
- Family: Gracillariidae
- Genus: †Gracillariites; Kozlov, 1987

Extinct genus of moths

Gracillariites is an extinct genus of moth in the family Gracillariidae, which existed in what is now Lithuania during the Eocene period. It was described by Kozlov in 1987, and the type species is Gracillariites lithuanicus. It also contains the species Gracillariites mixtus.
