= Moleropterix =

Scientific classification
- Kingdom: Animalia
- Phylum: Arthropoda
- Clade: Pancrustacea
- Class: Insecta
- Order: Lepidoptera
- Family: Micropterigidae
- Genus: †Moleropterix; Engel & Kinzelbach, 2008
- Species: †M. kalbei

Binomial name
- †Moleropterix kalbei Engel & Kinzelbach, 2008

Single-species extinct genus of moths

Moleropterix is an extinct genus of small primitive metallic moths within the family Micropterigidae, containing one species, Moleropterix kalbei. It is described from a well-preserved forewing of the Fur Formation of the earliest Eocene (Early Ypresian) of Denmark.
