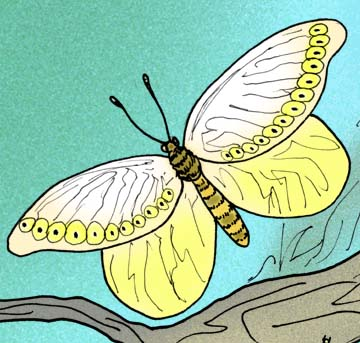
- Artist's reconstruction

Scientific classification
- Domain: Eukaryota
- Kingdom: Animalia
- Phylum: Arthropoda
- Class: Insecta
- Order: Lepidoptera
- Family: Nymphalidae
- Tribe: Nymphalini
- Genus: †Mylothrites; Scudder, 1875
- Species: †M. pluto

Binomial name
- †Mylothrites pluto (Heer, 1849)

Synonyms
- Vanessa pluto Heer, 1849

= Mylothrites =

Mylothrites Temporal range: Late Miocene

Extinct species of butterfly

Mylothrites pluto is an extinct butterfly known from Late Miocene-aged strata in Öhningen, Germany, at the border between Germany and Switzerland.

== Taxonomy ==
The fossil was originally placed in Vanessa by Oswald Heer, but was then moved to its own genus, Mylothrites, by Samuel Scudder.
