= Hexerites =

Scientific classification
- Kingdom: Animalia
- Phylum: Arthropoda
- Class: Insecta
- Order: Lepidoptera
- Family: Depressariidae
- Subfamily: Stenomatinae
- Genus: †Hexerites; Cockerell, 1933
- Species: †H. primalis

Binomial name
- †Hexerites primalis Cockerell, 1933

Single-species extinct genus of moths

Hexerites primalis is an extinct moth in the family Depressariidae, and the only species in the genus Hexerites. It was described by Theodore Dru Alison Cockerell in 1933. It was described from the Green River Eocene formation in Colorado.
