= Parasabatinca =

Parasabatinca Temporal range: Early Cretaceous ~130.0–112.6 Ma

Scientific classification
- Kingdom: Animalia
- Phylum: Arthropoda
- Clade: Pancrustacea
- Class: Insecta
- Order: Lepidoptera
- Family: Micropterigidae
- Genus: †Parasabatinca; Whalley 1978

Species
- †P. aftimacrai Whalley 1978; †P. caldasae Martins Neto & Vulcano 1989

Extinct genus of moths

Parasabatinca is an extinct genus of small primitive metallic moths within the extant family Micropterigidae or extinct family Eolepidopterigidae, containing two species. The first is Parasabatinca aftimacrai, of which fossil remains have been found in Lebanese amber and have been dated to the Lower Cretaceous.
