= Willershausen (Kalefeld) =

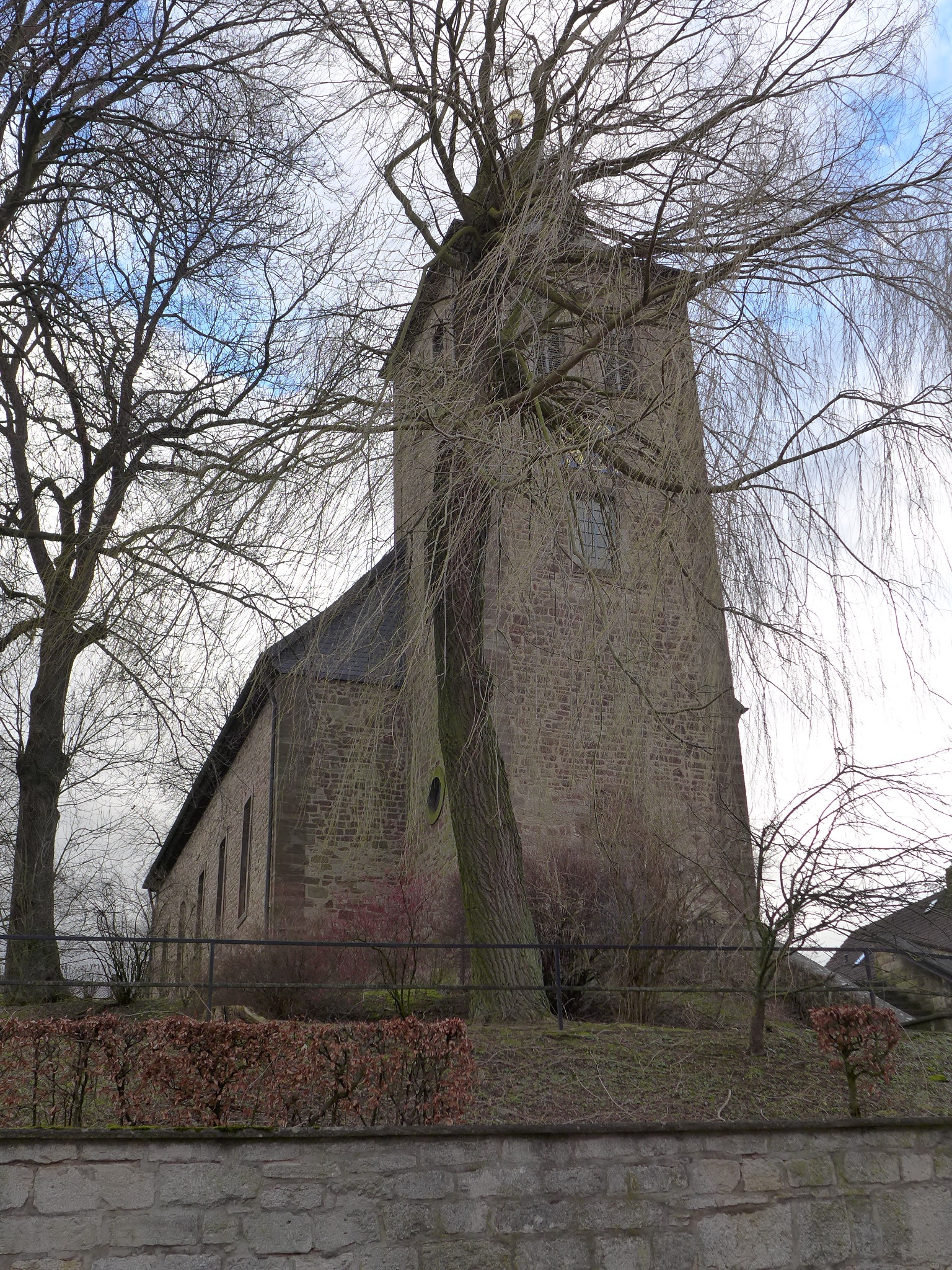

Willershausen is a village in the Northeim District, Lower Saxony, and part of the Kalefeld municipality.

== History ==
The village was first mentioned in a deed from 1294. Throughout the Middle Ages the Fulda monastery held fief rights in Willershausen village, so that in modern times a cross symbolising Fulda was integrated in the coat of arms of Willershausen village. Village inhabitants worked as farmers and in a brickyard, too. That brickyard was founded in the 16th century and shut down in 1977.

The raw material of the brickyard was clay which stemmed from a nearby Open-pit mining site. By about 1920, fossils were discovered there. Research was conducted by geologists and paleontologists of the University of Göttingen. The clay site was geologically formed in the pliocene epoch. Mining was stopped when the brickyard shut down. Among the fossils that were found are parts of Mammutidae, Giant salamander, fishes and ostracods, too. Calosoma sycophanta was among the insect fossils of the site. A single Comptonia fossil was found, too, which was unique in Europe. A Comptonia leaf was thus integrated in the coat of arms of Willershausen village.

== Main sights ==
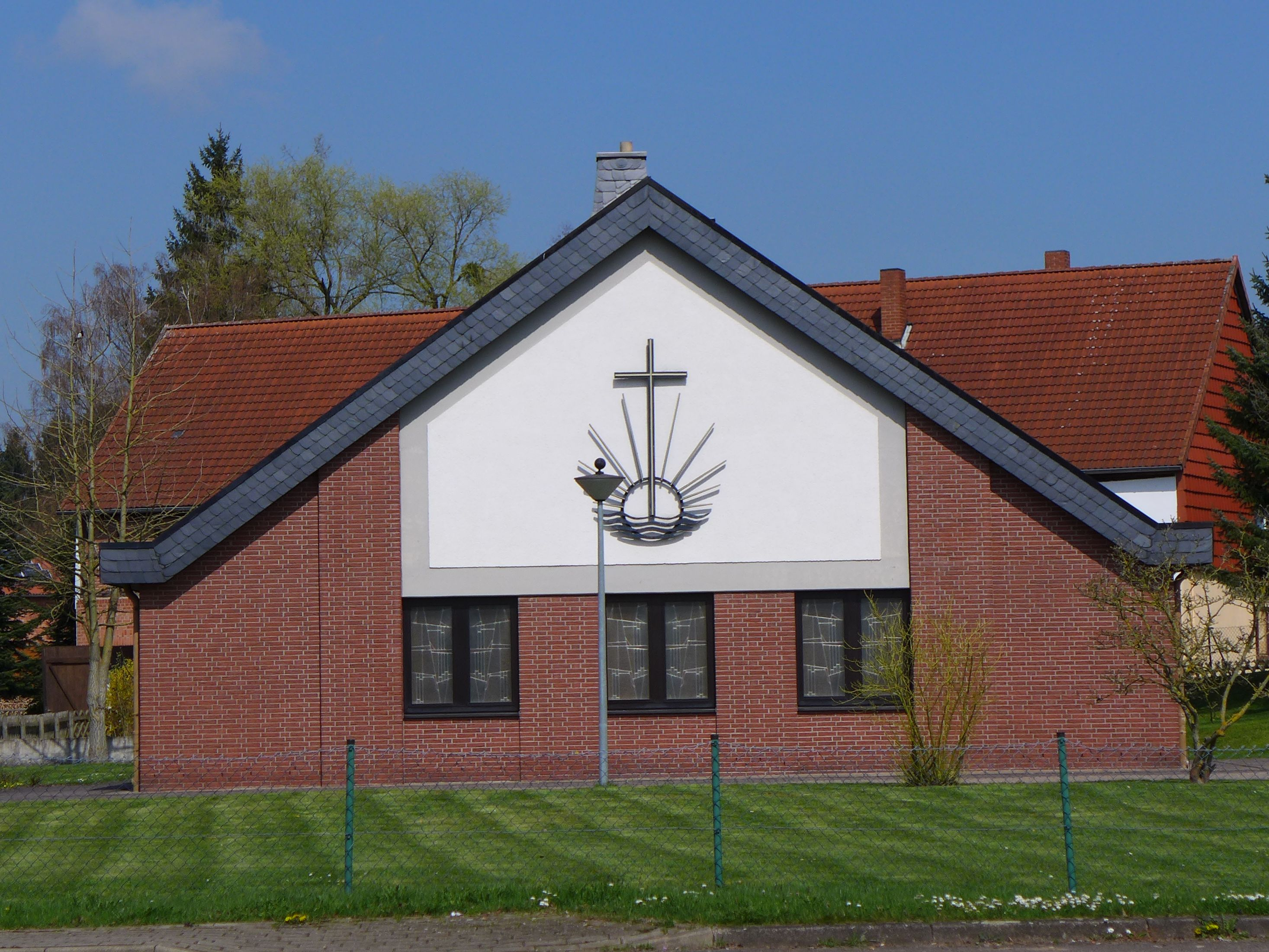
New Apostolic Church Willershausen

The former clay mine is a landmark of the Harz – Brunswick Land – Eastphalia National Geopark since 2012. It is a natural monument, too. In a local showroom examples of fossas from that clay site are exhibited.

The local Lutheran church was built in 1750 and is devoted to Pope Alexander I. The parish is part of Evangelical-Lutheran Church of Hanover. Its rectory was built in 1865 with plans of Conrad Wilhelm Hase.

A New Apostolic Church building was built in 1992.

== Reading ==
- Willershausen am Harz – Umrisse einer Dorfgeschichte (1998) (German)
