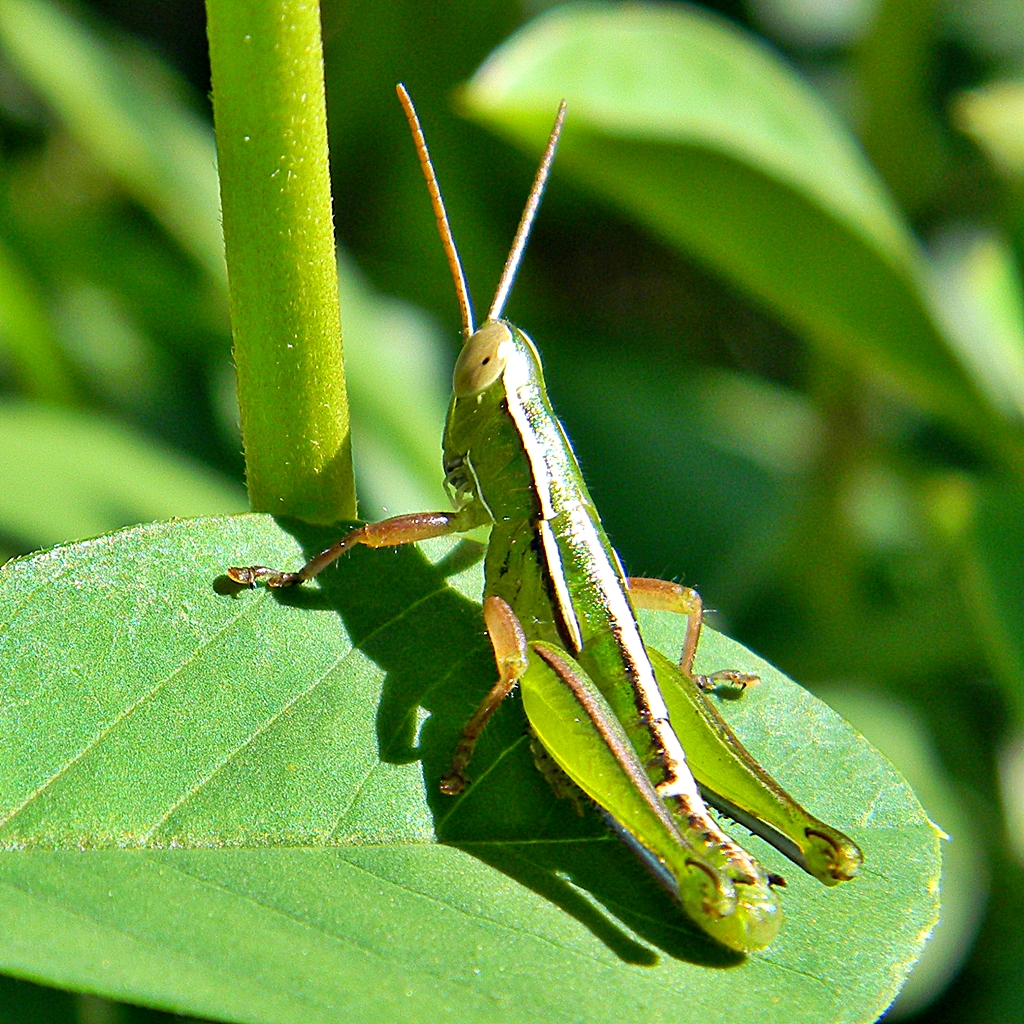
- A tiny young hopper(Aptenopedes sphenarioidesJonathan) warming up in the morning sunshine, Dickinson State Park.

Scientific classification
- Kingdom: Animalia
- Phylum: Arthropoda
- Clade: Pancrustacea
- Class: Insecta
- Order: Orthoptera
- Suborder: Caelifera
- Family: Acrididae
- Tribe: Conalcaeini
- Genus: Aptenopedes
- Species: A. sphenarioides

Binomial name
- Aptenopedes sphenarioides Scudder, 1878

= Aptenopedes sphenarioides =

Species of grasshopper

Aptenopedes sphenarioides, the linear-winged grasshopper, is a species of spur-throated grasshopper in the family Acrididae. It is found in North America.

== Subspecies ==
These three subspecies belong to the species Aptenopedes sphenarioides:

- Aptenopedes sphenarioides appalachee Hebard, 1936^{i}
- Aptenopedes sphenarioides clara Rehn, 1902^{i g}
- Aptenopedes sphenarioides sphenarioides Scudder, 1878^{i g}

Data sources: i = ITIS, c = Catalogue of Life, g = GBIF, b = Bugguide.net
