= Asemoplus =

Scientific classification
- Kingdom: Animalia
- Phylum: Arthropoda
- Clade: Pancrustacea
- Class: Insecta
- Order: Orthoptera
- Suborder: Caelifera
- Family: Acrididae
- Subfamily: Podisminae
- Genus: Asemoplus; Scudder, 1897

Genus of grasshoppers

Asemoplus is a genus of short-horned grasshoppers in the family Acrididae. There are at least three described species in Asemoplus.

== Species ==
These three species belong to the genus Asemoplus.

- Asemoplus hispidus (Bruner, 1885)
- Asemoplus montanus (Bruner, 1885) (Montana grasshopper)
- Asemoplus sierranus Hebard, 1936
