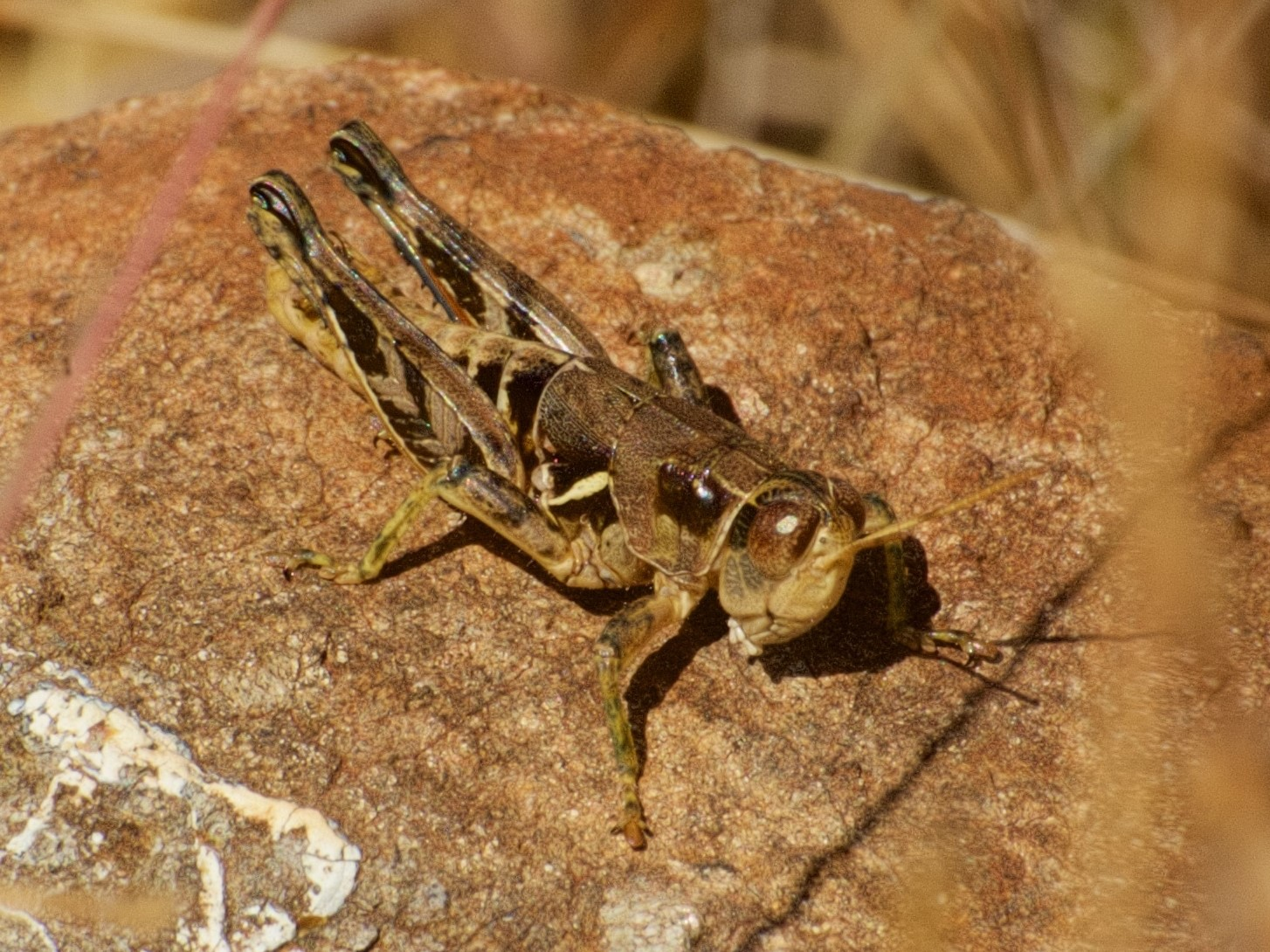
- Oedaleonotus borckii

Scientific classification
- Kingdom: Animalia
- Phylum: Arthropoda
- Clade: Pancrustacea
- Class: Insecta
- Order: Orthoptera
- Suborder: Caelifera
- Family: Acrididae
- Subfamily: Melanoplinae
- Tribe: Melanoplini
- Genus: Oedaleonotus; Scudder, 1897

= Oedaleonotus =

Genus of grasshoppers

Oedaleonotus is a genus of spur-throated grasshoppers in the family Acrididae. There are about nine described species in Oedaleonotus.

== Species ==
- Oedaleonotus borckii (Stål, 1860)
- Oedaleonotus enigma (Scudder, 1876) (valley grasshopper)
- Oedaleonotus orientis Hebard, 1920
- Oedaleonotus pacificus (Scudder, 1881)
- Oedaleonotus phryneicus Hebard, 1919
- Oedaleonotus pinctus (Scudder, 1899)
- Oedaleonotus tenuipennis (Scudder, 1897)
- Oedaleonotus truncatus Rehn, 1907
- Oedaleonotus werneri Yin and Smith, 1989
