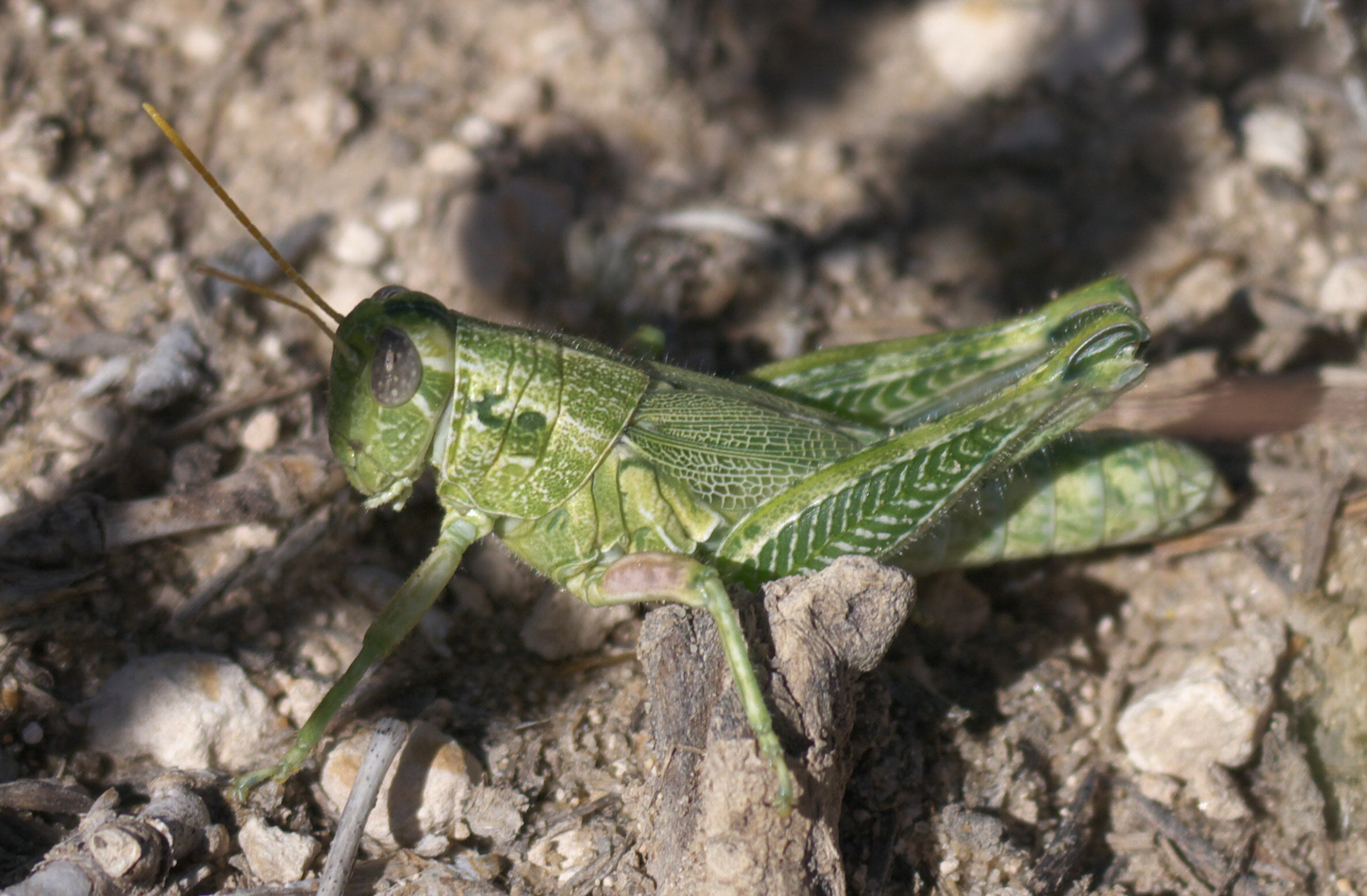
- Campylacantha olivacea

Scientific classification
- Domain: Eukaryota
- Kingdom: Animalia
- Phylum: Arthropoda
- Class: Insecta
- Order: Orthoptera
- Suborder: Caelifera
- Family: Acrididae
- Subfamily: Melanoplinae
- Tribe: Dactylotini
- Genus: Campylacantha; Scudder, 1897

= Campylacantha =

Genus of grasshoppers

Campylacantha is a genus of spur-throated grasshoppers in the family Acrididae. There are about five described species in Campylacantha.

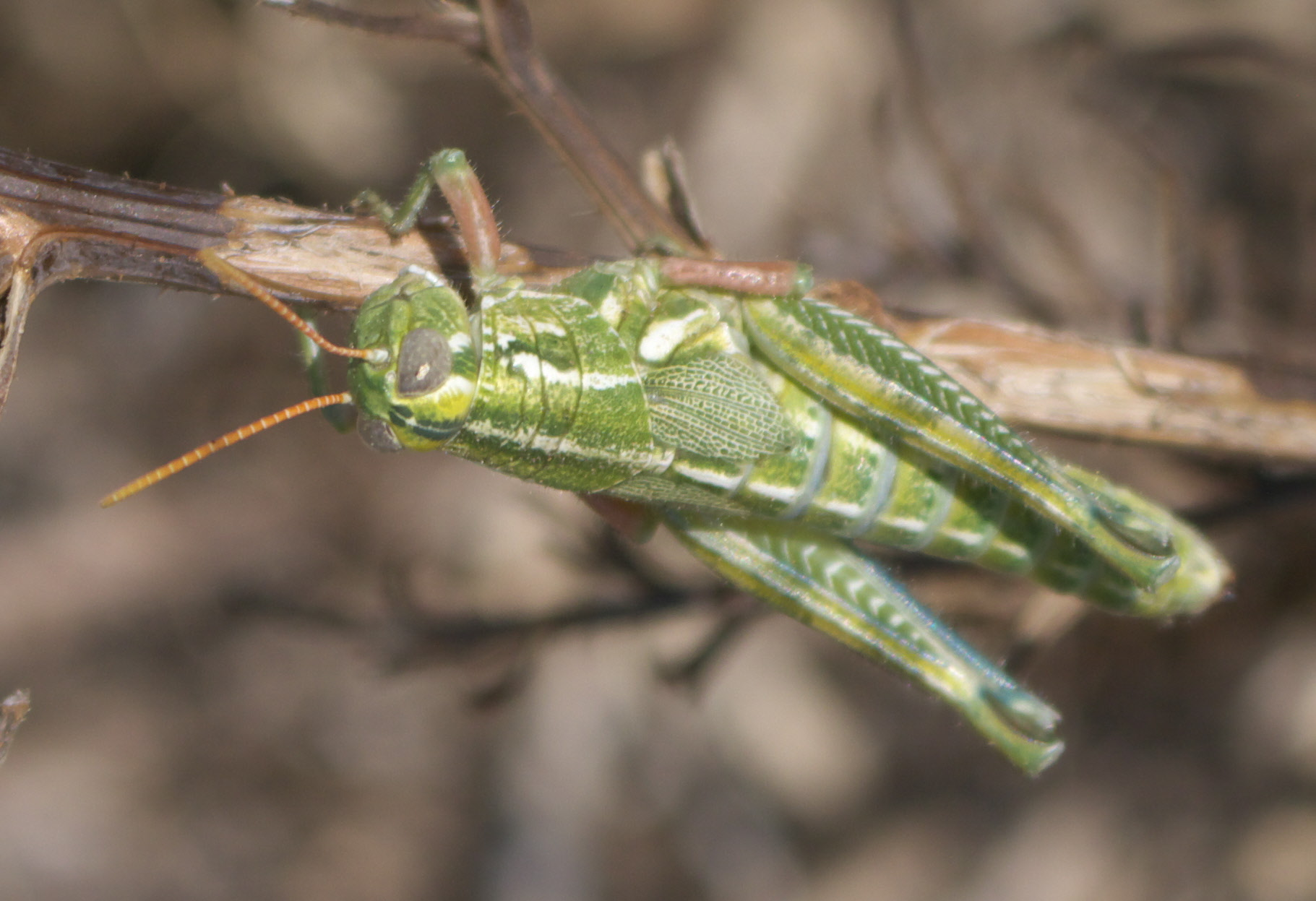
Campylacantha olivacea olivacea

== Species ==
These five species belong to the genus Campylacantha:

- Campylacantha acutipennis (Scudder, 1875)^{i}
- Campylacantha lamprotata Rehn and Hebard, 1909^{i c g}
- Campylacantha olivacea (Scudder, 1875)^{i c g b} (fuzzy olive-green grasshopper)
- Campylacantha vegana Scudder and Cockerell, 1902^{i c g}
- Campylacantha vivax (Scudder, 1876)^{i}

Data sources: i = ITIS, c = Catalogue of Life, g = GBIF, b = Bugguide.net
