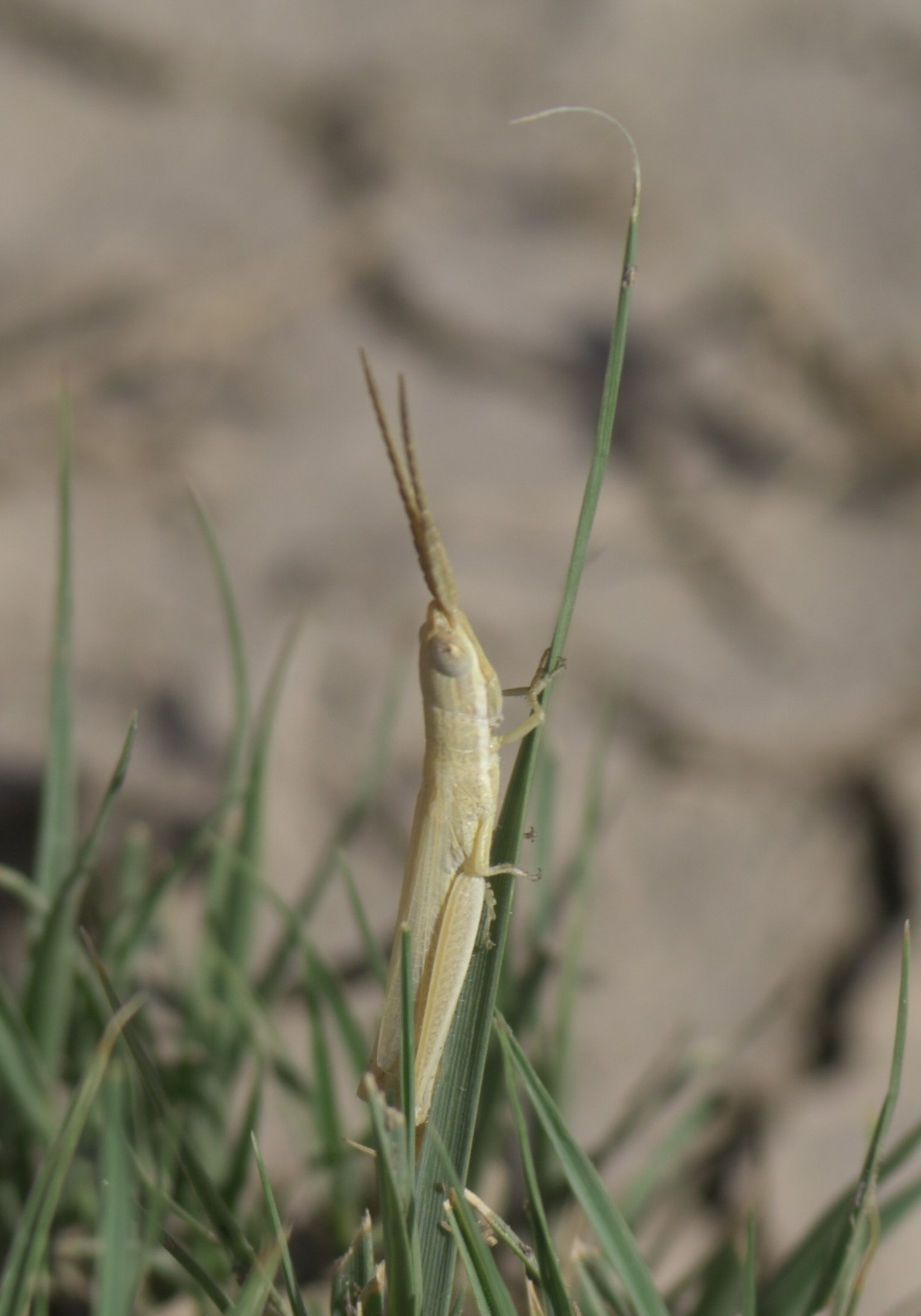
- Paropomala wyomingensis

Scientific classification
- Kingdom: Animalia
- Phylum: Arthropoda
- Class: Insecta
- Order: Orthoptera
- Suborder: Caelifera
- Family: Acrididae
- Subfamily: Gomphocerinae
- Genus: Paropomala; Scudder, 1899

= Paropomala =

Genus of grasshoppers

Paropomala is a genus of North American grasshoppers in the subfamily Gomphocerinae. There are at least three described species in Paropomala.

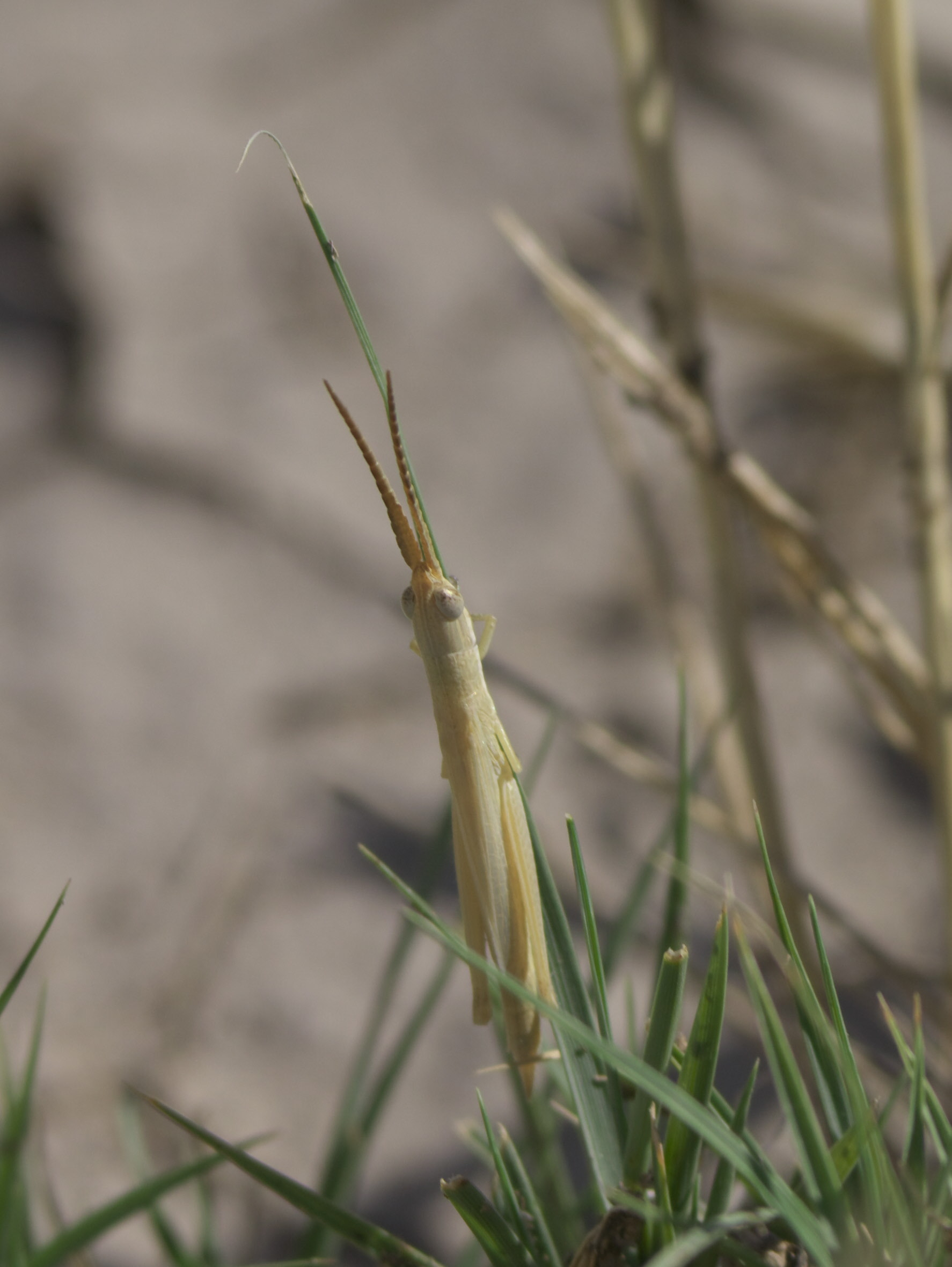
Paropomala wyomingensis

== Species ==
- Paropomala pallida Bruner, 1904 (pale toothpick grasshopper)
- Paropomala virgata Scudder, 1899 (virgata toothpick grasshopper)
- Paropomala wyomingensis (Thomas, 1871) (Wyoming toothpick grasshopper)
