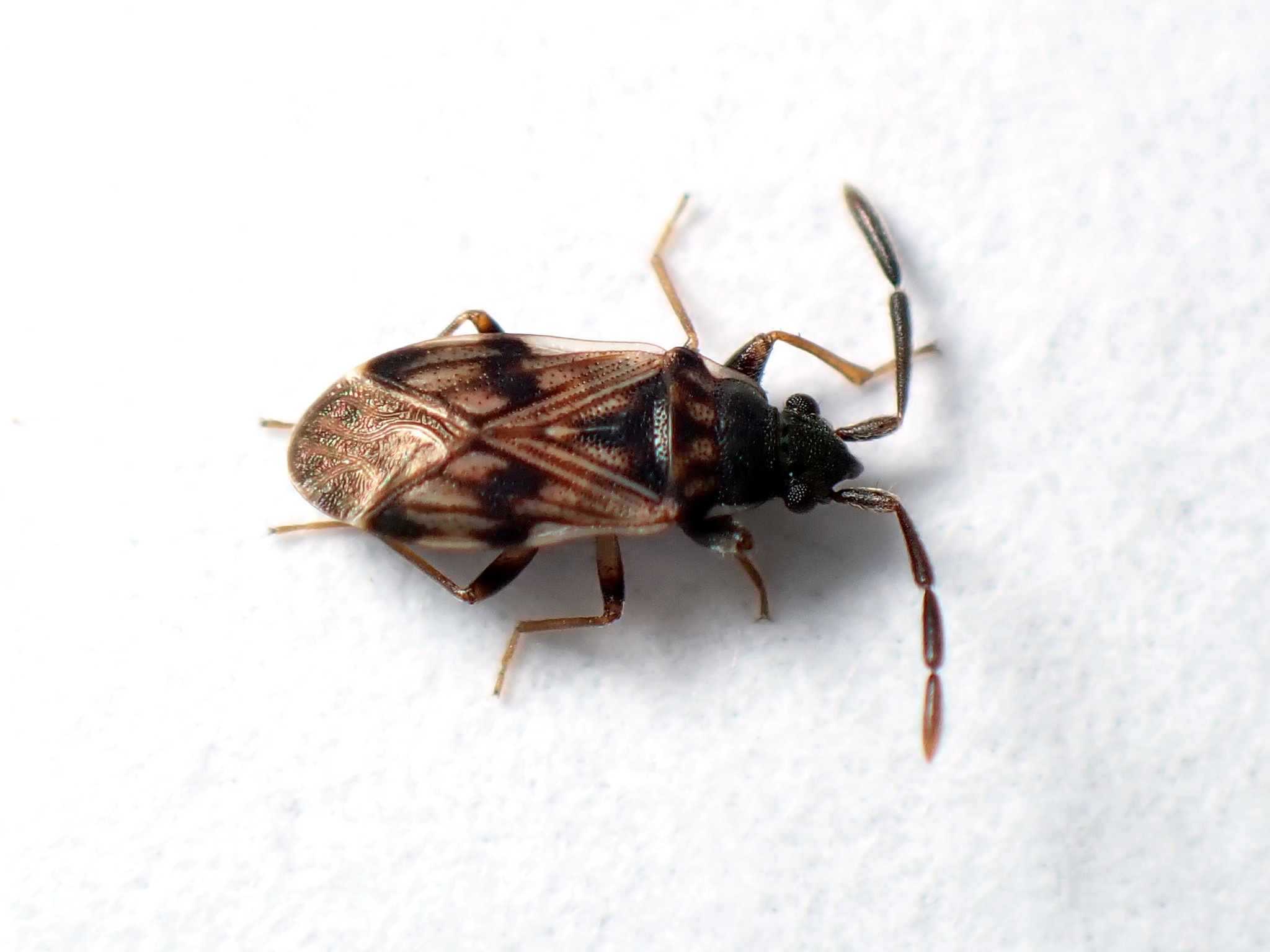
- Brentiscerus putoni, Australia

Scientific classification
- Domain: Eukaryota
- Kingdom: Animalia
- Phylum: Arthropoda
- Class: Insecta
- Order: Hemiptera
- Suborder: Heteroptera
- Family: Rhyparochromidae
- Subfamily: Rhyparochrominae
- Tribe: Drymini
- Genus: Brentiscerus; Scudder, 1962

= Brentiscerus =

Genus of insects

Brentiscerus is a genus of dirt-colored seed bugs in the family Rhyparochromidae. There are at least two described species in Brentiscerus, found in Australia and New Zealand.

== Species ==
These two species belong to the genus Brentiscerus:

- Brentiscerus obscurus Gross, 1965
- Brentiscerus putoni (White, 1878)
