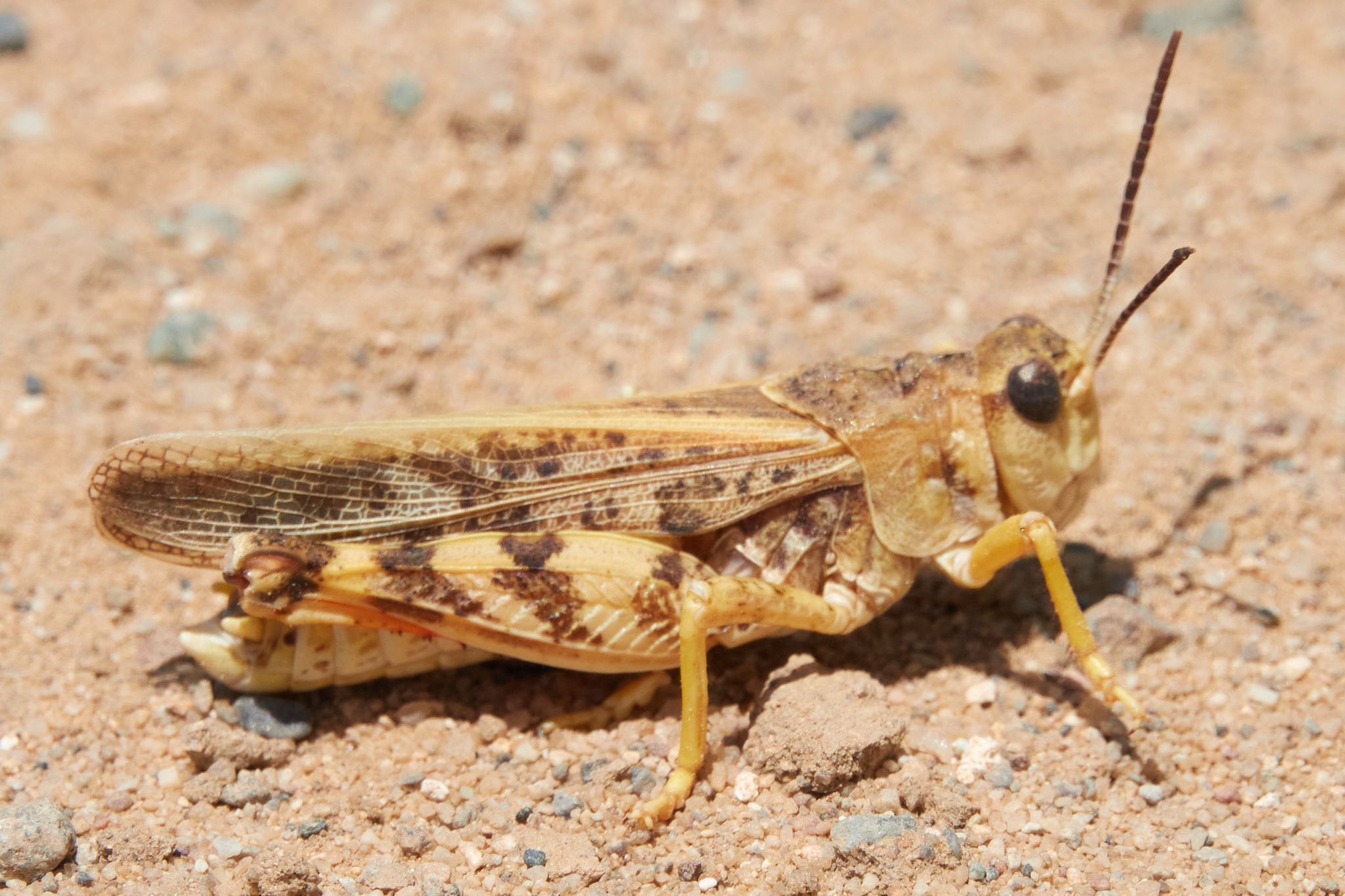
- Sticthippus californicus, fastigial range grasshopper, California, USA

Scientific classification
- Kingdom: Animalia
- Phylum: Arthropoda
- Clade: Pancrustacea
- Class: Insecta
- Order: Orthoptera
- Suborder: Caelifera
- Family: Acrididae
- Subfamily: Oedipodinae
- Tribe: Hippiscini
- Genus: Sticthippus
- Species: S. californicus

Binomial name
- Sticthippus californicus (Scudder, 1892)

= Sticthippus californicus =

Species of band-winged grasshopper

Sticthippus californicus, the fastigial range grasshopper, is a species of band-winged grasshopper in the family Acrididae. It is found in western North America.
