= Phaedrotettix =

Scientific classification
- Kingdom: Animalia
- Phylum: Arthropoda
- Clade: Pancrustacea
- Class: Insecta
- Order: Orthoptera
- Suborder: Caelifera
- Family: Acrididae
- Tribe: Melanoplini
- Genus: Phaedrotettix; Scudder, 1897

Genus of spur-throated grasshoppers in the family Acrididae

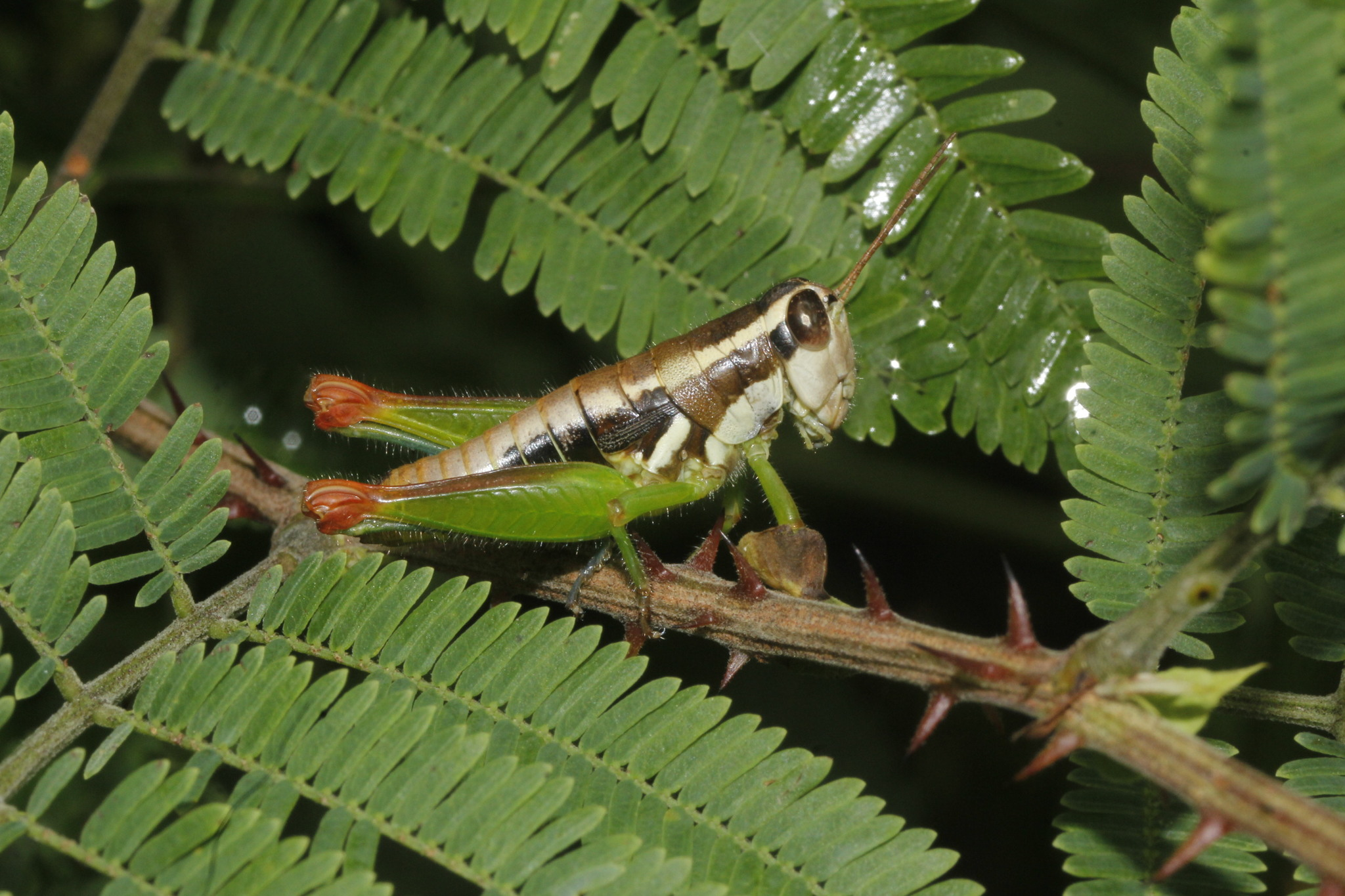
Phaedrotettix violai

Phaedrotettix is a genus of spur-throated grasshoppers in the family Acrididae. Twelve species are recognized in the genus as of August 2026.

== Species ==
- Phaedrotettix accola (Scudder, 1897)
- Phaedrotettix angustipennis Scudder, 1897
- Phaedrotettix bilineatus Descamps, 1975
- Phaedrotettix concinnus (Scudder, 1897)
- Phaedrotettix dumicola (Scudder, 1878)
- Phaedrotettix gracilis (Bruner, 1908)
- Phaedrotettix gualaguises Fontana & Buzzetti, 2007
- Phaedrotettix litus Hebard, 1917
- Phaedrotettix palmeri (Scudder, 1897)
- Phaedrotettix toltecus Fontana & Buzzetti, 2007
- Phaedrotettix valgus (Scudder, 1897)
- Phaedrotettix violai Fontana & Buzzetti, 2007
