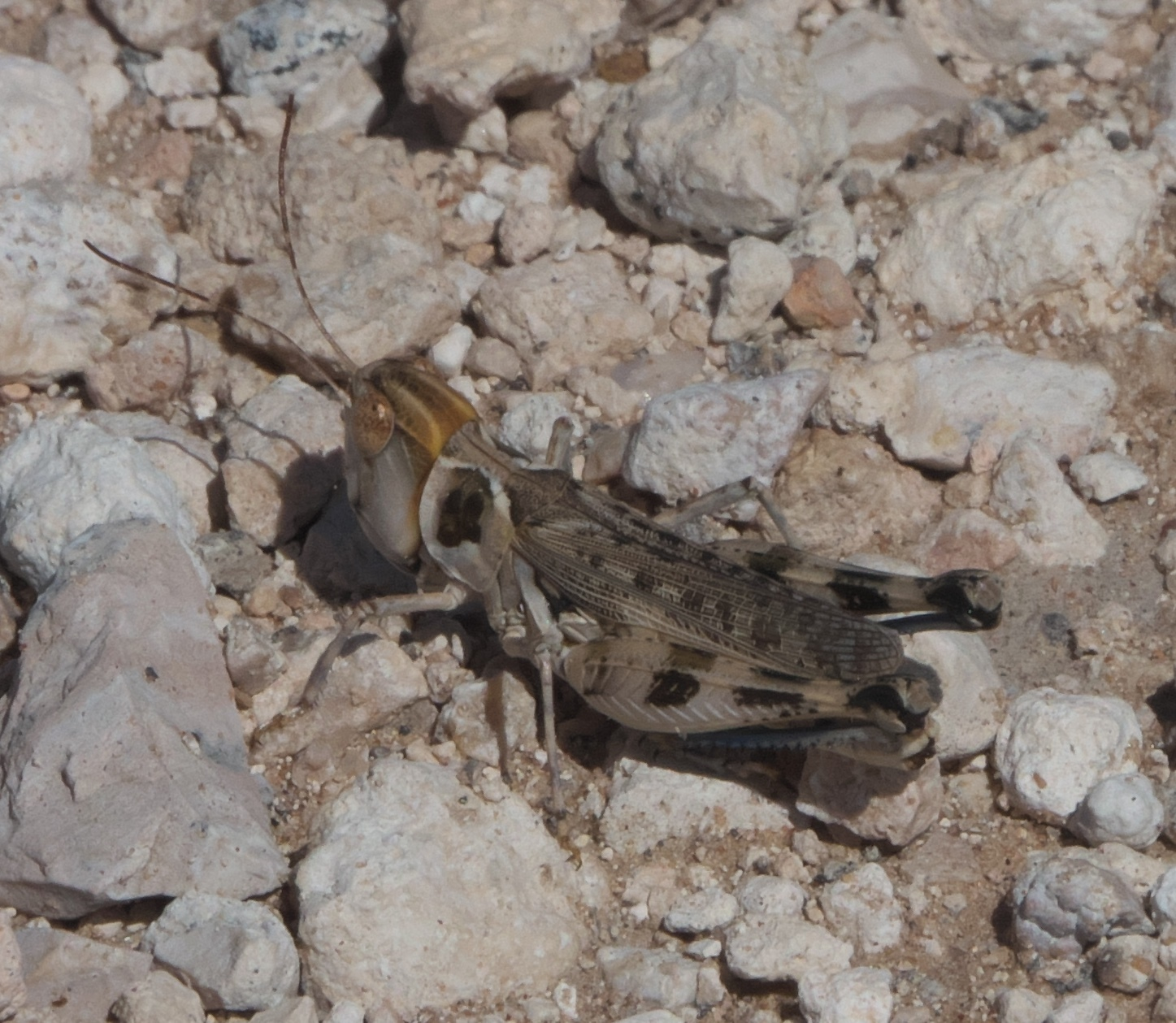
- Aulocara femoratum, New Mexico

Scientific classification
- Domain: Eukaryota
- Kingdom: Animalia
- Phylum: Arthropoda
- Class: Insecta
- Order: Orthoptera
- Suborder: Caelifera
- Family: Acrididae
- Subfamily: Gomphocerinae
- Genus: Aulocara
- Species: A. femoratum

Binomial name
- Aulocara femoratum Scudder, 1899

= Aulocara femoratum =

Species of grasshopper

Aulocara femoratum, known generally as the white-crossed grasshopper or white cross grasshopper, is a species of slant-faced grasshopper in the family Acrididae. It is found in Central America and North America.
