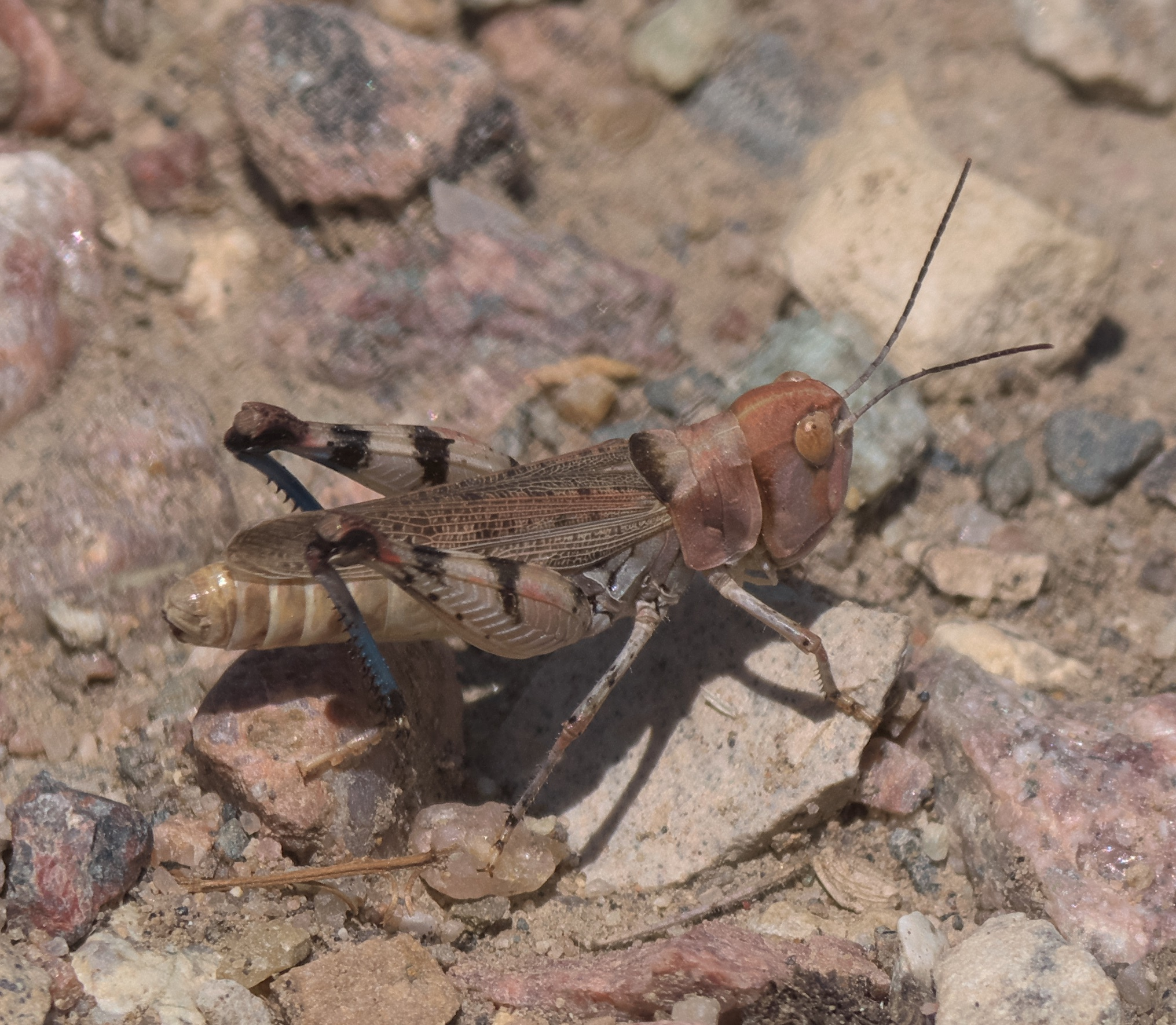
- Aulocara elliotti

Scientific classification
- Domain: Eukaryota
- Kingdom: Animalia
- Phylum: Arthropoda
- Class: Insecta
- Order: Orthoptera
- Suborder: Caelifera
- Family: Acrididae
- Subfamily: Gomphocerinae
- Genus: Aulocara; Scudder, 1876

= Aulocara =

Genus of grasshoppers

Aulocara is a genus of slant-faced grasshoppers in the family Acrididae. There are at least three described species in Aulocara.

== Species ==
These three species belong to the genus Aulocara:

- Aulocara brevipenne (Bruner, 1905)
- Aulocara elliotti (Thomas, 1870) (big-headed grasshopper)
- Aulocara femoratum Scudder, 1899 (white-crossed grasshopper)
