= Aptenopedes aptera =

Scientific classification
- Domain: Eukaryota
- Kingdom: Animalia
- Phylum: Arthropoda
- Class: Insecta
- Order: Orthoptera
- Suborder: Caelifera
- Family: Acrididae
- Genus: Aptenopedes
- Species: A. aptera

Binomial name
- Aptenopedes aptera Scudder, 1878

Species of grasshopper

Aptenopedes aptera, the wingless Florida grasshopper, is a species of spur-throated grasshopper in the family Acrididae. It is found in North America.

== Subspecies ==
These five subspecies belong to the species Aptenopedes aptera:

- Aptenopedes aptera aptera Scudder, 1878^{i}
- Aptenopedes aptera borealis Hebard, 1936^{i}
- Aptenopedes aptera coquinae Hebard, 1936^{i}
- Aptenopedes aptera saturiba Hebard, 1936^{i}
- Aptenopedes aptera simplex Hebard, 1936^{i}

Data sources: i = ITIS, c = Catalogue of Life, g = GBIF, b = Bugguide.net
