= Phaulotettix =

Scientific classification
- Kingdom: Animalia
- Phylum: Arthropoda
- Clade: Pancrustacea
- Class: Insecta
- Order: Orthoptera
- Suborder: Caelifera
- Family: Acrididae
- Subfamily: Melanoplinae
- Tribe: Melanoplini
- Genus: Phaulotettix; Scudder, 1897

Genus of grasshoppers

Phaulotettix is a genus of Nearctic, grasshoppers in the family Acrididae and subfamily Melanoplinae. There are about 15 described species in Phaulotettix.

== Species ==
These 15 species belong to the genus Phaulotettix:

- Phaulotettix ablusus Barrientos Lozano, Rocha-Sánchez & Méndez-Gómez, 2^{c g}
- Phaulotettix adiaphoros Barrientos Lozano, Rocha-Sánchez & Méndez-Gómez, 2^{c g}
- Phaulotettix adibilis Barrientos Lozano, Rocha-Sánchez & Méndez-Gómez, 2^{c g}
- Phaulotettix adynatos Barrientos Lozano, Rocha-Sánchez & Méndez-Gómez, 2^{c g}
- Phaulotettix affinis Barrientos Lozano, Rocha-Sánchez & Méndez-Gómez, 2^{c g}
- Phaulotettix altissimus Barrientos Lozano, Rocha-Sánchez & Méndez-Gómez, 2^{c g}
- Phaulotettix ambrosius Barrientos Lozano, Rocha-Sánchez & Méndez-Gómez, 2^{c g}
- Phaulotettix arcadius Barrientos Lozano, Rocha-Sánchez & Méndez-Gómez, 2^{c g}
- Phaulotettix compressus Scudder, S.H., 1897^{c g b}
- Phaulotettix eurycercus Hebard, 1918^{i c g b} (sotol grasshopper)
- Phaulotettix flaccidus Barrientos Lozano, Rocha-Sánchez & Méndez-Gómez, 2^{c g}
- Phaulotettix huastecus Buzzetti, Barrientos Lozano & Fontana, 2010^{c g}
- Phaulotettix jocundus Barrientos Lozano, Rocha-Sánchez & Méndez-Gómez, 2^{c g}
- Phaulotettix nimius Barrientos Lozano, Rocha-Sánchez & Méndez-Gómez, 2^{c g}
- Phaulotettix opimus Barrientos Lozano, Rocha-Sánchez & Méndez-Gómez, 2^{c g}

Data sources: i = ITIS, c = Catalogue of Life, g = GBIF, b = Bugguide.net
