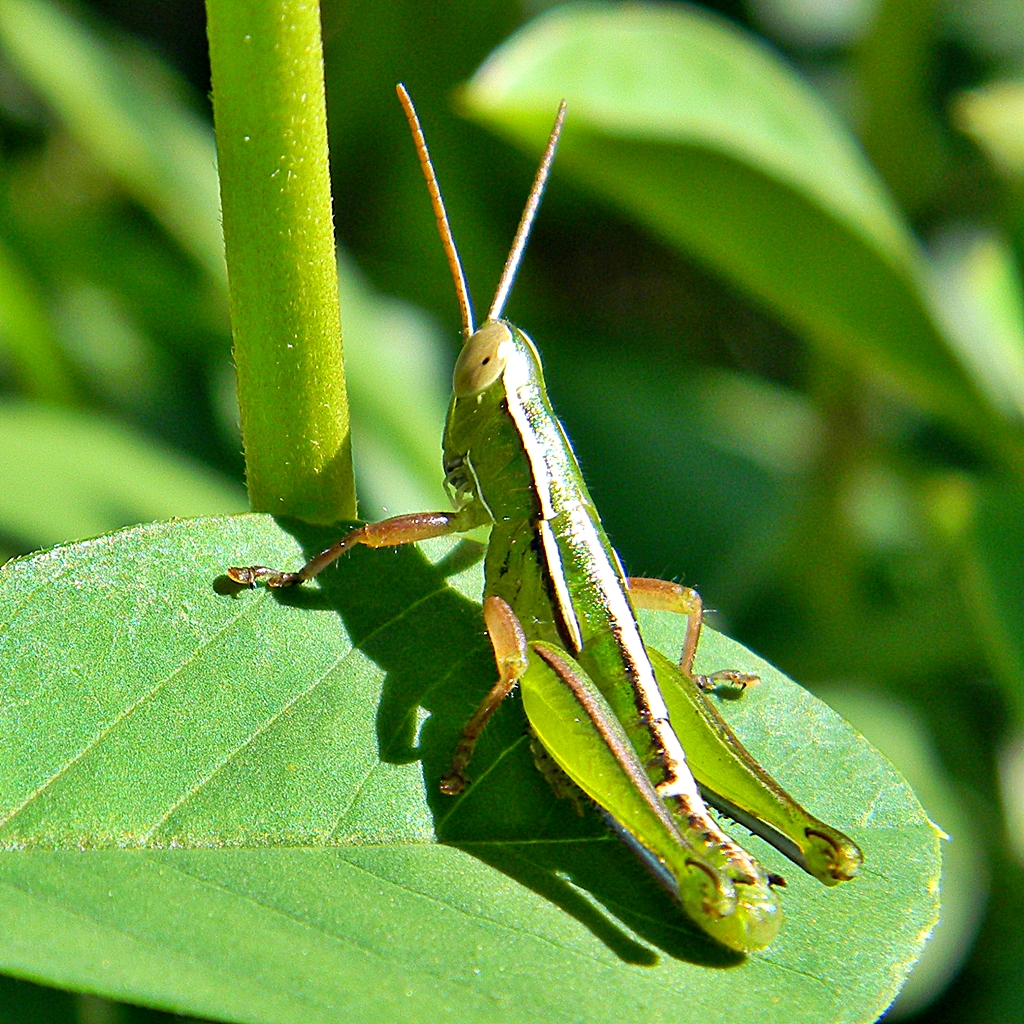
- Aptenopedes sphenarioides

Scientific classification
- Domain: Eukaryota
- Kingdom: Animalia
- Phylum: Arthropoda
- Class: Insecta
- Order: Orthoptera
- Suborder: Caelifera
- Family: Acrididae
- Subfamily: Melanoplinae
- Tribe: Conalcaeini
- Genus: Aptenopedes; Scudder, 1877

= Aptenopedes =

Genus of grasshoppers

Aptenopedes is a genus of spur-throated grasshoppers in the family Acrididae. There are about 13 described species in Aptenopedes.

== Species ==
These 13 species belong to the genus Aptenopedes:

- Aptenopedes appalachee Hebard, 1936^{c g}
- Aptenopedes aptera Scudder, 1878^{i b} (wingless Florida grasshopper)
- Aptenopedes chefixico Otte, D., 2014^{c g}
- Aptenopedes chiaha Otte, D., 2014^{c g}
- Aptenopedes clara Rehn, J.A.G., 1902^{c g}
- Aptenopedes hubbelli Hebard, 1936^{i}
- Aptenopedes menawai Otte, D., 2014^{c g}
- Aptenopedes nigropicta Hebard, 1936^{i}
- Aptenopedes robusta Hebard, 1936^{i}
- Aptenopedes rufovittata Scudder, 1878^{i c g}
- Aptenopedes sphenarioides Scudder, 1878^{i c g b} (linear-winged grasshopper)
- Aptenopedes sphenax Otte, D., 2014^{c g}
- Aptenopedes yoholoi Otte, D., 2014^{c g}

Data sources: i = ITIS, c = Catalogue of Life, g = GBIF, b = Bugguide.net
