= Charlotte Hill =

American homesteader and specimen collector

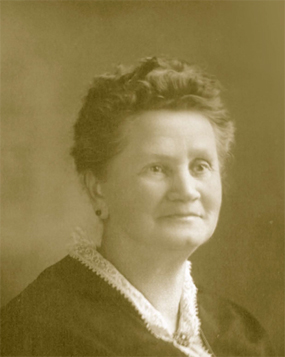
- Homesteader, Charlotte Hill (1849-1930)
- Born: February 15, 1849; Fulton County, Indiana
- Died: April 11, 1930 (aged 81); Sacramento, California
- Occupation: Specimen collector
- Spouse: Adam Hill
- Children: 7

Charlotte Hill (1849–1930) was a homesteader born in Indiana who contributed to paleontology through finding several significant fossil within the Florissant Fossil Beds. She sold many fossils to other collectors and investigators to earn money on the side. Her most significant discovery was the Persephone butterfly near Florissant, Colorado. Charlotte's discoveries brought attention to Florissant as an important location for fossils, and her findings created an impetus for recognition of the fossil beds as a national monument within the United States of America. Many of her collected fossils now reside in the Harvard University museum and the Smithsonian's Museum of Natural History.

The fossil rose Rosa hilliae was named after Charlotte Hill in 1883.

== Early life ==
Hill was born on February 15, 1849, in Indiana. She migrated west from Indiana, pioneering into the then-new settlement of Colorado City in 1874. Charlotte married her husband, Adam Hill, at the age of thirteen. Both built their home in Florissant in 1874 and filed a homestead claim in 1880. The Homestead Act of 1862 is how most of the private land in the midwestern United States became the private land of homesteaders to encourage farming. This Act included private ownership by single women and formerly enslaved people. Together, the couple raised seven children, two of whom died at young ages. Children's names were Hiram (age 12), Walter (age 10), Margaret (age 5) and Mable (age 1). According to the 1880 census, Charlotte's occupation was listed in the same census as "Keeps House," while her husband Adam's occupation was listed as "collects specimens." Another child Minnie Bell died in December 1877 at 11 years old. Two other children had died previously. Furthermore, Charlotte's brother, John D. Coplen, helped form the Colorado Museum Association in 1883 to transport petrified stumps to city museums and fossils to be displayed later opened "Coplen's Petrified Forest." A resort for tourists to stay and collect fossils, hosting approximately 3,000 visitors in 1924. Charlotte Hill's museum in Colorado City was one of 14 businesses listed in the 1984 Colorado City business directory, displaying specimens from the Florissant fossil beds. Colorado City is where Hill's interest of fossils first began as the city is just beside the Florissant Fossil Beds.

== Work ==
The mid-1870s led to a historic boom surrounding the Florissant fossil beds, ultimately leading to two highly notable scientific finds. In the summer of 1877, 18 Princeton students and two professors made their way down to the fossil beds. Three involved students led the trip; Henry Fairfield Osborn, William Berryman Scott, and Francis Speir. When the Princeton students arrived in Colorado, they met with Charlotte Hill, who showed them an impressive fossil collection containing hundreds of perfectly preserved species of insects and leaves. The Princeton students took many of these fossils back home for study and excavated several leaf and fish fossils of their own during their time in Florissant. Many of these shared discoveries became essential type specimens for the descriptions of new species.. In the same summer, Hill met scientists Samuel H. Scudder and Arthur Lakes, who were amazed by her extensive collection of fossils. With Hill's help, Scudder and Lakes conducted a large-scale dig close to Hill's homestead. The excavation consisted of digging a massive trench, in which researchers could find fossils within delicate shale beds by cracking the shale in half. However, many fossils were lost during this process, as shale becomes very delicate when exposed to the elements and would often crumble with fossils still hidden inside. In turn, Leo Lesquereux's 1883 monograph described and named many new specimens obtained by Scudder and the Princeton Scientific Expedition of 1877, which purchased fossils from Hill. In 1890, Scudder published a monograph detailing several prominent finds from Florissant entitled The Tertiary Insects of North America. The monograph was a jaw-dropping size of seven hundred and thirty-four pages and weighed an astonishing seven pounds. The study of butterflies was fascinating to Scudder, and his work helped make Hill's perfectly preserved Prodryas persephone famous. In the 1880 census, Adam and Charlotte listed their profession as specimen collectors. They began selling their finds to educational institutions and tourists. Charlotte kept a small museum in their family home, built by Adam Hill in 1874. Specimen collection and sale became a profession for many as homesteaders, academics, and tourists scavenged the fossil-rich land situated just south of Hill's home, beside the sizeable petrified base of a Sequoia stump, known as "The Big Stump." The Florissant Fossil Beds were heavily exploited during this time. This meant that thousands of potentially valuable fossils disappeared into the hands of private owners, never to be seen again by the scientific world. With the introduction of the railway, thousands of tourists flooded the area, and these scientific losses only grew. It would not be until 1915, when Dinosaur National Monument was established by the U.S government, that similar conservation concerns would be expressed towards Florissant. The area would not be named a protected national monument until 1969.

== Personal life ==
Hill died on April 11, 1930, in Sacramento, California. She was buried next to her husband in Oakwood Memorial Park in Santa Cruz, California.

=== Legacy ===
A monument was unveiled on Hill's 160th birthday in 2009, recognizing her accomplishments and impact on the collection of fossils and the establishment of the Florissant Fossil Beds.
