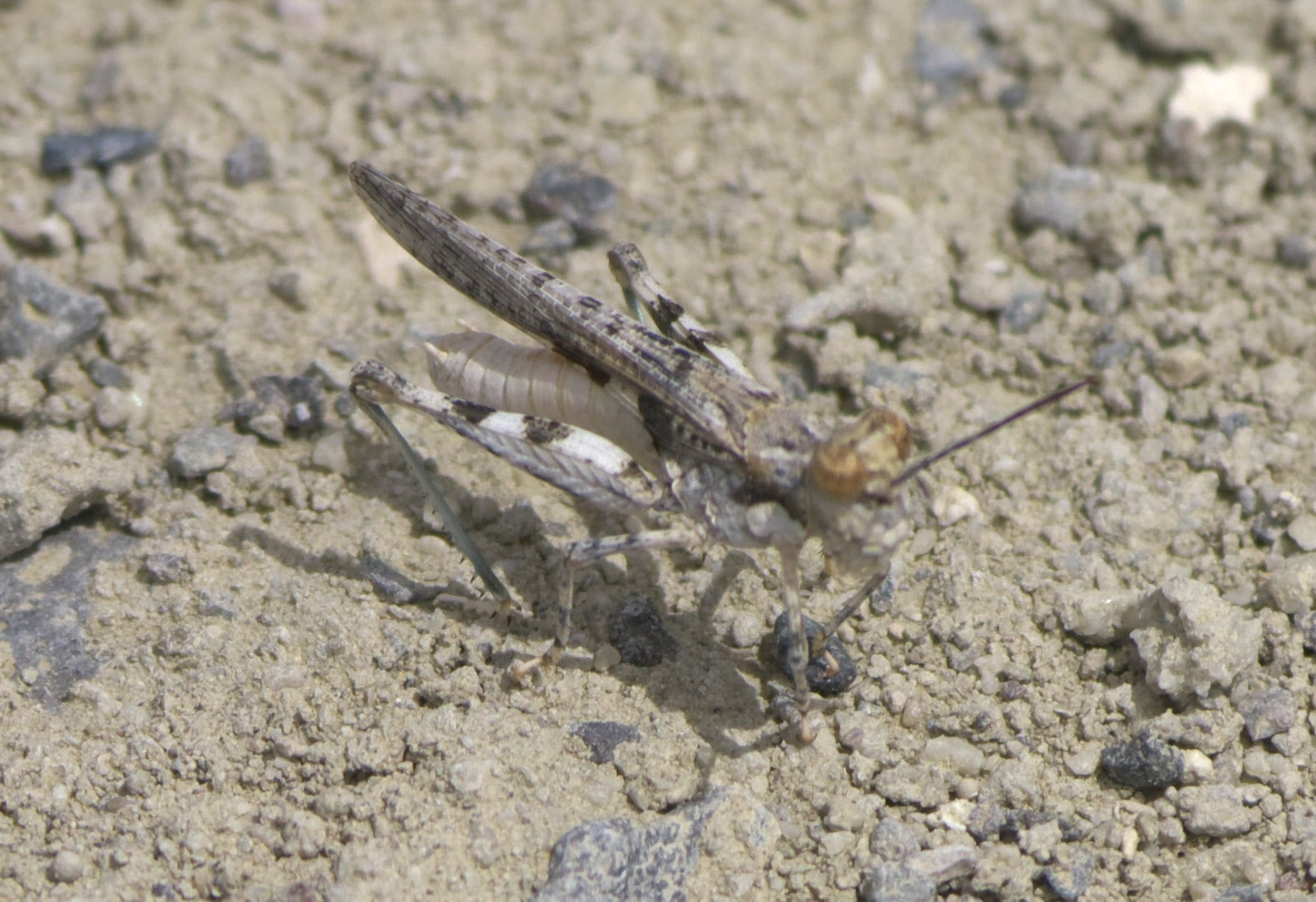
- Trepidulus rosaceus, Nevada

Scientific classification
- Kingdom: Animalia
- Phylum: Arthropoda
- Clade: Pancrustacea
- Class: Insecta
- Order: Orthoptera
- Suborder: Caelifera
- Family: Acrididae
- Tribe: Psinidiini
- Genus: Trepidulus
- Species: T. rosaceus

Binomial name
- Trepidulus rosaceus (Scudder, 1900)

= Trepidulus rosaceus =

Species of grasshopper

Trepidulus rosaceus, the shy rose-winged grasshopper, is a species of band-winged grasshopper in the family Acrididae. It is found in Central America and North America.
