= Gymnoscirtetes =

Scientific classification
- Domain: Eukaryota
- Kingdom: Animalia
- Phylum: Arthropoda
- Class: Insecta
- Order: Orthoptera
- Suborder: Caelifera
- Family: Acrididae
- Subfamily: Melanoplinae
- Tribe: Dactylotini
- Genus: Gymnoscirtetes; Scudder, 1897

Genus of grasshoppers

Gymnoscirtetes is a genus of spur-throated grasshoppers in the family Acrididae. There are at least 2 described species in Gymnoscirtetes. The genus was first described in Samuel Hubbard Scudder's book Revision of the orthopteran group Melanopli (Acridiidae), with special reference to North American forms.

== Species ==
- G. morsei Hebard, 1918 (Morse's wingless grasshopper)
- G. pusillus Scudder, 1897 (little wingless grasshopper)
