= Gymnoscirtetes pusillus =

Scientific classification
- Domain: Eukaryota
- Kingdom: Animalia
- Phylum: Arthropoda
- Class: Insecta
- Order: Orthoptera
- Suborder: Caelifera
- Family: Acrididae
- Genus: Gymnoscirtetes
- Species: G. pusillus

Binomial name
- Gymnoscirtetes pusillus Scudder, 1897

Species of grasshopper

Gymnoscirtetes pusillus, the little wingless grasshopper, is a species of spur-throated grasshopper in the family Acrididae. It is found in North America.
