= Paropomala virgata =

Scientific classification
- Kingdom: Animalia
- Phylum: Arthropoda
- Clade: Pancrustacea
- Class: Insecta
- Order: Orthoptera
- Suborder: Caelifera
- Family: Acrididae
- Genus: Paropomala
- Species: P. virgata

Binomial name
- Paropomala virgata Scudder, 1899

Species of grasshopper

Paropomala virgata, the virgata toothpick grasshopper, is a species of slant-faced grasshopper in the family Acrididae. It is found in Central America and North America.
