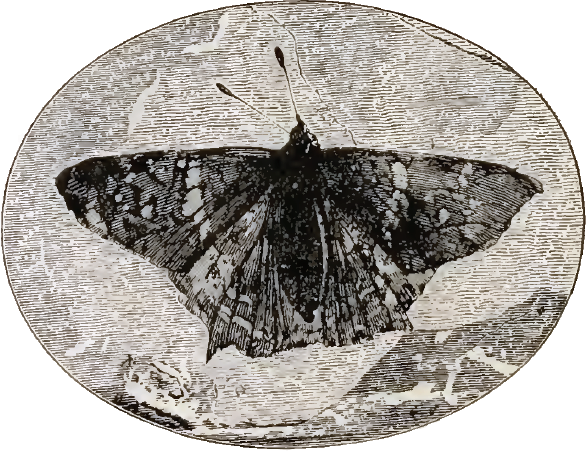
- An 1887 engraving of P. persephone

Scientific classification
- Kingdom: Animalia
- Phylum: Arthropoda
- Clade: Pancrustacea
- Class: Insecta
- Order: Lepidoptera
- Family: Nymphalidae
- Subfamily: Nymphalinae
- Genus: †Prodryas; Scudder, 1878
- Species: †P. persephone

Binomial name
- †Prodryas persephone Scudder, 1878

= Prodryas =

Prodryas Temporal range: Chadronian

Extinct species of butterfly

Prodryas persephone is an extinct species of brush-footed butterfly, known from a single specimen from the Chadronian-aged Florissant Shale Lagerstätte of Late Eocene Colorado. P. persephone is the first fossil butterfly to be found in North America, and is exquisitely well preserved. Its closest extant relatives are the mapwings and African admirals of the genera Hypanartia and Antanartia, respectively.

== Significance ==
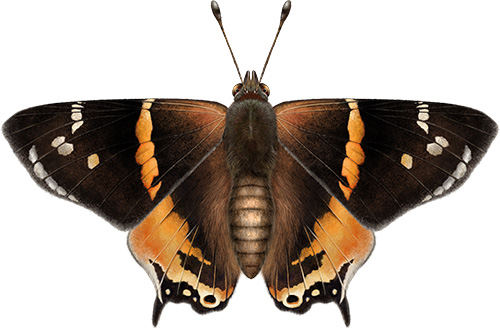
Color reconstruction of Prodryas persephone based on the colors of Hypanartia and Antanartia.

The type specimen, now held at the Museum of Comparative Zoology of Harvard University, was the first fossil butterfly to be found in North America, and has been described as "possibly the best fossil butterfly specimen ever found". The appearance of a figure of Prodryas in Samuel Hubbard Scudder's book Frail Children of the Air influenced the paleontologist Frank M. Carpenter to embark on his career. Scudder exhibited the specimen at the Royal Entomological Society of London in December 1893.

== Description ==
The single known specimen of P. persephone is a compression fossil, discovered by the "homesteader turned naturalist" Charlotte Hill, in shale deposits of Late Eocene age of the Florissant Formation near Florissant, Colorado.

The butterfly has a wing length of 24.5 mm (1.0 in), and the specimen is complete, although the trailing edge of one hindwing was originally covered. The upper surface of the animal is visible, and the legs can only barely be seen. The head is turned to one side, revealing the mouthparts as well as both antennae. The wing venation is exquisitely preserved, and even the patterns of color on the wings are clearly visible. Individual wing scales can be discerned in parts of the forewing.

== Taxonomy ==
Based on Charlotte Hill's specimen, Samuel Hubbard Scudder described the new genus and species Prodryas persephone in 1878, although the first figure only appeared in 1899. The specific epithet persephone alludes to Persephone, wife of Hades, and the daughter of Zeus and Demeter. (Two other species named by Scudder in the same work also bear names referring to the underworld in Greek mythology: Lithopsyche styx (referring to the river Styx) and Jupitellia charon (referring to Charon).)

Although placed in a separate genus, Prodryas persephone is thought to be closely related to Hypanartia, and may be even closer to Antanartia.
