= Gymnoscirtetes morsei =

Scientific classification
- Domain: Eukaryota
- Kingdom: Animalia
- Phylum: Arthropoda
- Class: Insecta
- Order: Orthoptera
- Suborder: Caelifera
- Family: Acrididae
- Tribe: Dactylotini
- Genus: Gymnoscirtetes
- Species: G. morsei

Binomial name
- Gymnoscirtetes morsei Hebard, 1918

Species of grasshopper

Gymnoscirtetes morsei, or Morse's wingless grasshopper, is a species of spur-throated grasshopper in the family Acrididae. It is found in North America.
