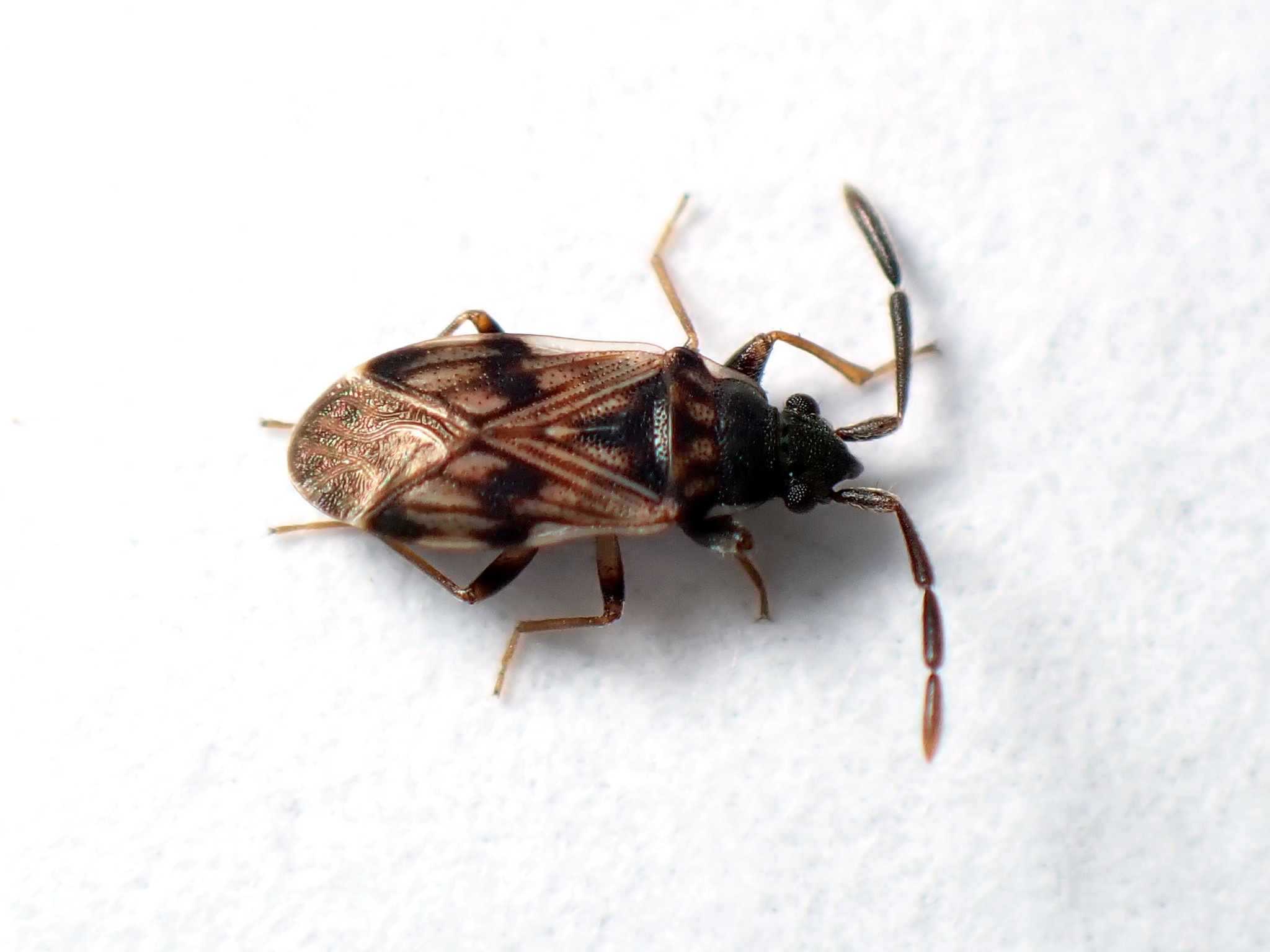
- Brentiscerus putoni, Australia

Scientific classification
- Domain: Eukaryota
- Kingdom: Animalia
- Phylum: Arthropoda
- Class: Insecta
- Order: Hemiptera
- Suborder: Heteroptera
- Family: Rhyparochromidae
- Subfamily: Rhyparochrominae
- Tribe: Drymini
- Genus: Brentiscerus
- Species: B. putoni

Binomial name
- Brentiscerus putoni (White, 1878)

Synonyms
- Scolopostethus putoni Taphropeltus javanus Taphropeltus australis

= Brentiscerus putoni =

Species of dirt-colored seed bug

Brentiscerus putoni is a species of dirt-colored seed bug in the family Rhyparochromidae, found in Oceania. It feeds on Eucalyptus seeds.
