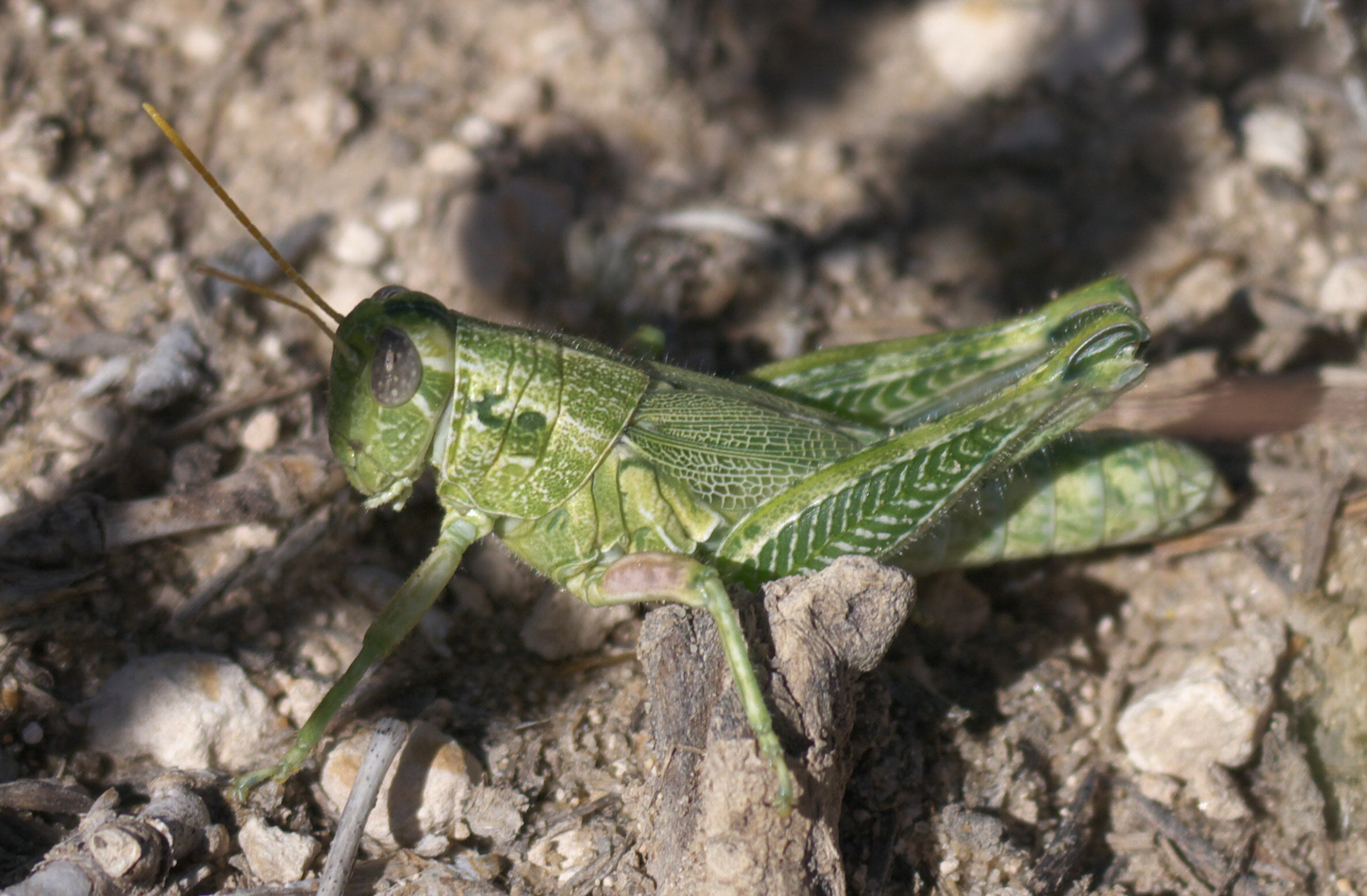

Scientific classification
- Domain: Eukaryota
- Kingdom: Animalia
- Phylum: Arthropoda
- Class: Insecta
- Order: Orthoptera
- Suborder: Caelifera
- Family: Acrididae
- Tribe: Dactylotini
- Genus: Campylacantha
- Species: C. olivacea

Binomial name
- Campylacantha olivacea (Scudder, 1875)

= Campylacantha olivacea =

Species of grasshopper

Campylacantha olivacea, known generally as the fuzzy olive-green grasshopper or olive grasshopper, is a species of spur-throated grasshopper in the family Acrididae. It is found in North America.

== Subspecies ==
These three subspecies belong to the species Campylacantha olivacea:

- Campylacantha olivacea olivacea (Scudder, 1875)^{i c g b} (fuzzy olive-green grasshopper)
- Campylacantha olivacea similis Scudder & S.H., 1897^{c g}
- Campylacantha olivacea vivax (Scudder & S.H., 1876)^{c g b}

Data sources: i = ITIS, c = Catalogue of Life, g = GBIF, b = Bugguide.net
