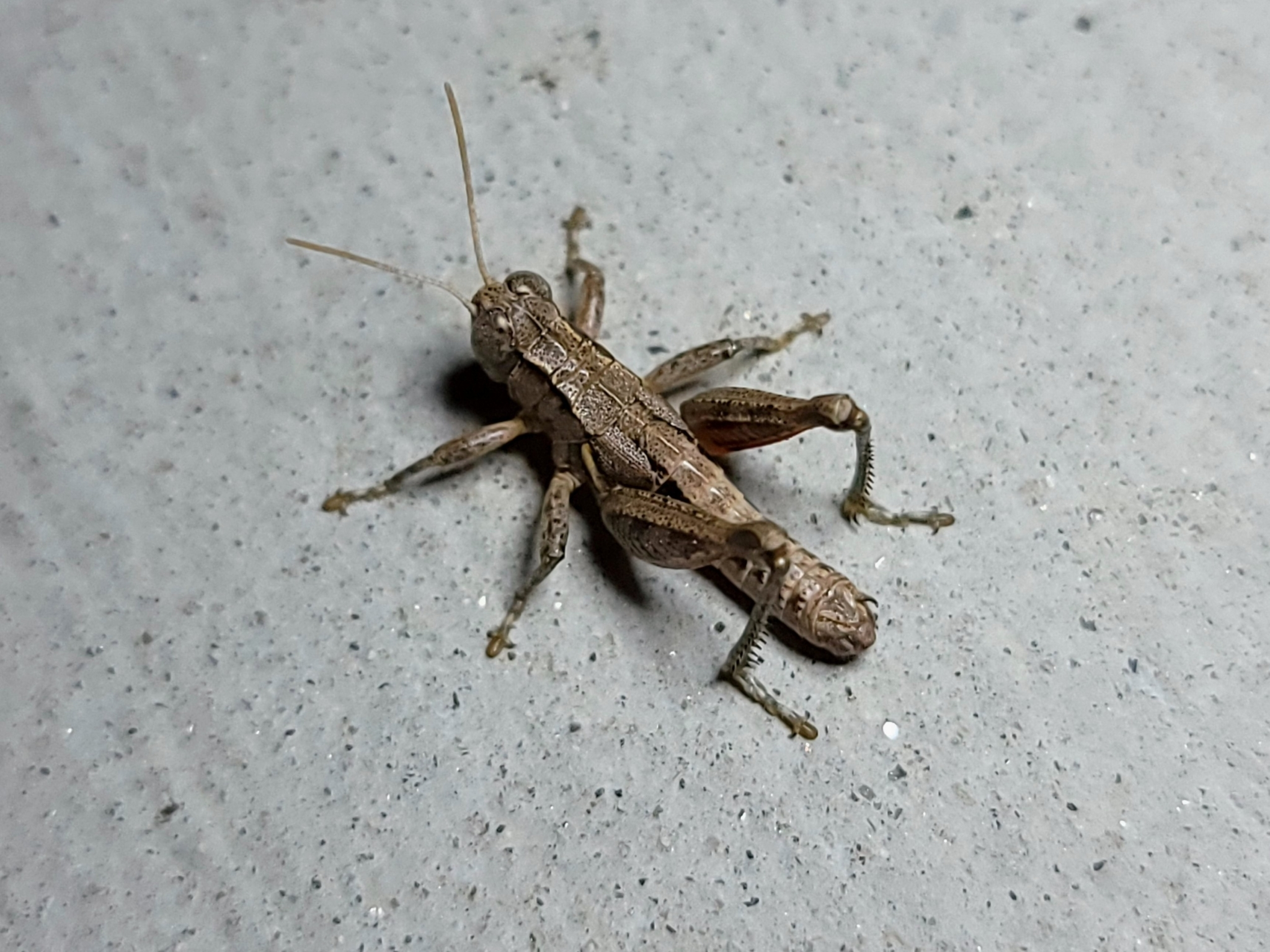

Scientific classification
- Kingdom: Animalia
- Phylum: Arthropoda
- Clade: Pancrustacea
- Class: Insecta
- Order: Orthoptera
- Suborder: Caelifera
- Family: Acrididae
- Tribe: Melanoplini
- Genus: Oedaleonotus
- Species: O. tenuipennis

Binomial name
- Oedaleonotus tenuipennis (Scudder, 1897)

= Oedaleonotus tenuipennis =

Species of grasshopper

Oedaleonotus tenuipennis is a species of spur-throated grasshopper in the family Acrididae. It is found in North America.
