= Phaedrotettix accola =

Scientific classification
- Kingdom: Animalia
- Phylum: Arthropoda
- Clade: Pancrustacea
- Class: Insecta
- Order: Orthoptera
- Suborder: Caelifera
- Family: Acrididae
- Genus: Phaedrotettix
- Species: P. accola

Binomial name
- Phaedrotettix accola (Scudder, 1897)

Synonyms
- Cyclocercus accola Scudder, 1897

Species of grasshopper

Phaedrotettix accola is a species of spur-throated grasshopper in the family Acrididae. It is found in North America.
