= Trepidulus hyalinus =

Scientific classification
- Kingdom: Animalia
- Phylum: Arthropoda
- Clade: Pancrustacea
- Class: Insecta
- Order: Orthoptera
- Suborder: Caelifera
- Family: Acrididae
- Tribe: Psinidiini
- Genus: Trepidulus
- Species: T. hyalinus

Binomial name
- Trepidulus hyalinus (Scudder, 1900)

Species of grasshopper

Trepidulus hyalinus, or Scudder's clearwinged grasshopper, is a species of band-winged grasshopper in the family Acrididae. It is found in North America.
