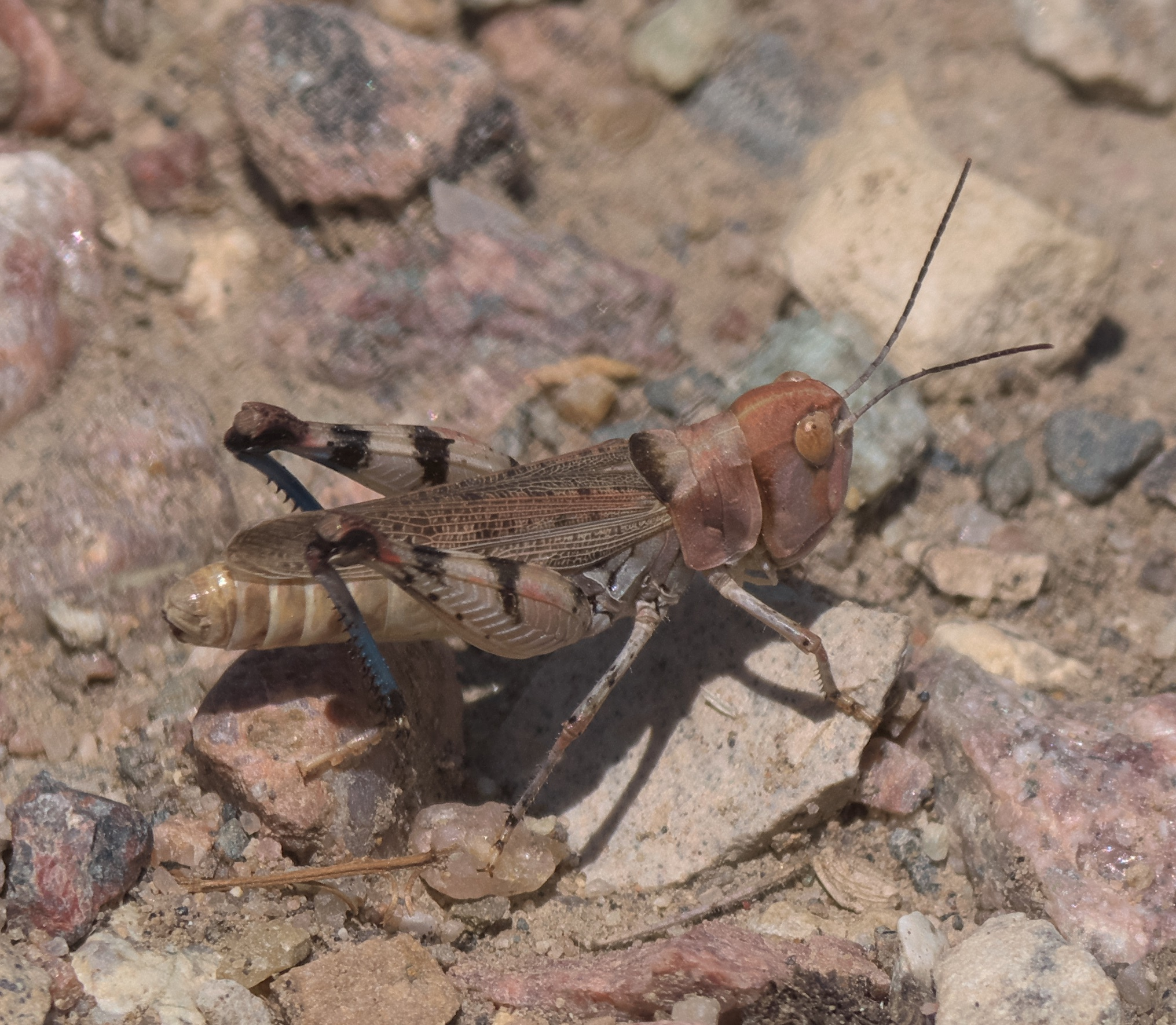

Scientific classification
- Domain: Eukaryota
- Kingdom: Animalia
- Phylum: Arthropoda
- Class: Insecta
- Order: Orthoptera
- Suborder: Caelifera
- Family: Acrididae
- Subfamily: Gomphocerinae
- Genus: Aulocara
- Species: A. elliotti

Binomial name
- Aulocara elliotti (Thomas, 1870)

= Aulocara elliotti =

Species of grasshopper

Aulocara elliotti, the big-headed grasshopper, is a species of slant-faced grasshopper in the family Acrididae. It is found in Central America and North America.
