= Trepidulus =

Scientific classification
- Domain: Eukaryota
- Kingdom: Animalia
- Phylum: Arthropoda
- Class: Insecta
- Order: Orthoptera
- Suborder: Caelifera
- Family: Acrididae
- Subfamily: Oedipodinae
- Tribe: Psinidiini
- Genus: Trepidulus; McNeill, 1901

Genus of grasshoppers

Trepidulus is a genus of band-winged grasshoppers in the family Acrididae. There are at least three described species in Trepidulus.

== Species ==
These three species belong to the genus Trepidulus:

- Trepidulus concinens Otte, 1984
- Trepidulus hyalinus (Scudder, 1900) (Scudder's clearwinged grasshopper)
- Trepidulus rosaceus (Scudder, 1900) (shy rose-winged grasshopper)
