= Phaulotettix eurycercus =

Scientific classification
- Kingdom: Animalia
- Phylum: Arthropoda
- Clade: Pancrustacea
- Class: Insecta
- Order: Orthoptera
- Suborder: Caelifera
- Family: Acrididae
- Tribe: Melanoplini
- Genus: Phaulotettix
- Species: P. eurycercus

Binomial name
- Phaulotettix eurycercus Hebard, 1918

Species of grasshopper

Phaulotettix eurycercus, the sotol grasshopper, is a species of spur-throated grasshopper in the family Acrididae. It is found in North America.
