= Asemoplus sierranus =

Scientific classification
- Kingdom: Animalia
- Phylum: Arthropoda
- Clade: Pancrustacea
- Class: Insecta
- Order: Orthoptera
- Suborder: Caelifera
- Family: Acrididae
- Genus: Asemoplus
- Species: A. sierranus

Binomial name
- Asemoplus sierranus Hebard, 1936

Species of grasshopper

Asemoplus sierranus is a species of short-horned grasshopper in the family Acrididae. It is found in North America.
