= Phaedrotettix concinnus =

Scientific classification
- Kingdom: Animalia
- Phylum: Arthropoda
- Clade: Pancrustacea
- Class: Insecta
- Order: Orthoptera
- Suborder: Caelifera
- Family: Acrididae
- Genus: Phaedrotettix
- Species: P. concinnus

Binomial name
- Phaedrotettix concinnus (Scudder, S.H., 1897)

Species of grasshopper

Phaedrotettix concinnus is a species of spur-throated grasshopper in the family Acrididae.
