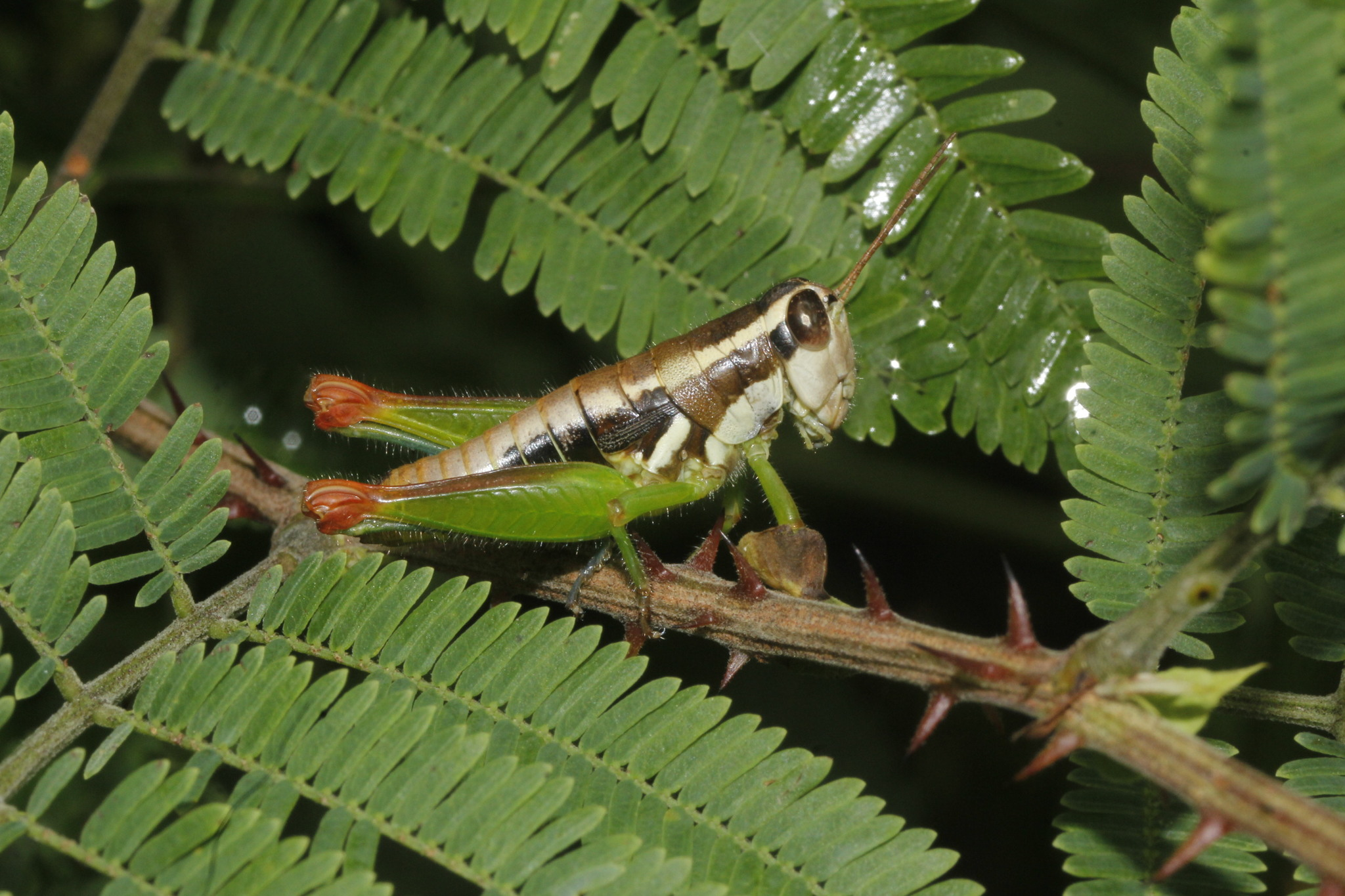
- Phaedrotettix violai, Mexico

Scientific classification
- Kingdom: Animalia
- Phylum: Arthropoda
- Clade: Pancrustacea
- Class: Insecta
- Order: Orthoptera
- Suborder: Caelifera
- Family: Acrididae
- Subfamily: Melanoplinae
- Tribe: Melanoplini
- Genus: Phaedrotettix
- Species: P. violai

Binomial name
- Phaedrotettix violai Fontana & Buzzetti, 2007

= Phaedrotettix violai =

Species of spur-throated grasshopper

Phaedrotettix violai is a species of spur-throated grasshopper in the family Acrididae. It is found in Mexico and the southern United States.
