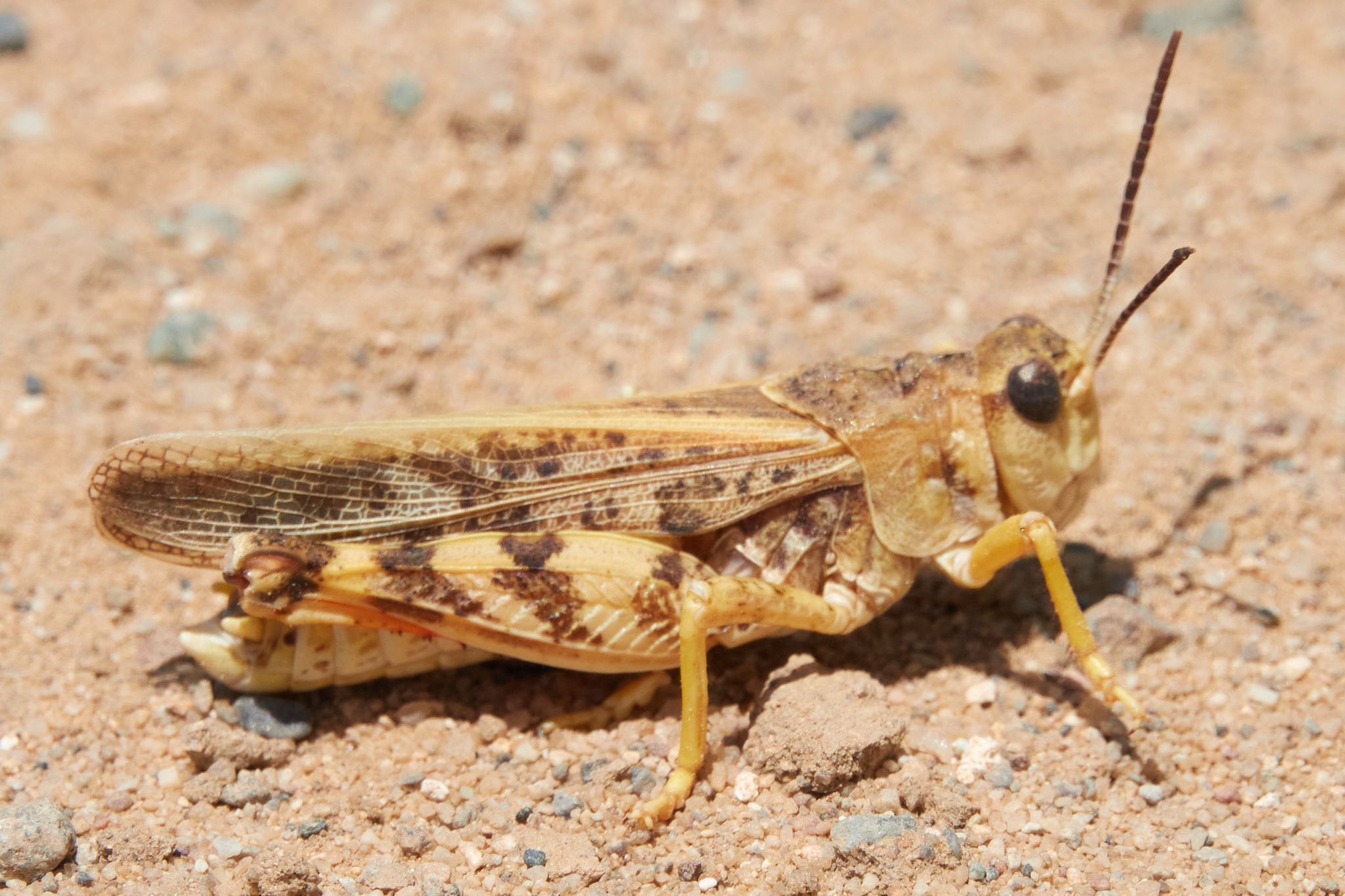
- Sticthippus californicus

Scientific classification
- Domain: Eukaryota
- Kingdom: Animalia
- Phylum: Arthropoda
- Class: Insecta
- Order: Orthoptera
- Suborder: Caelifera
- Family: Acrididae
- Subfamily: Oedipodinae
- Tribe: Hippiscini
- Genus: Sticthippus; Scudder, 1892
- Species: S. californicus

Binomial name
- Sticthippus californicus (Scudder, 1892)

= Sticthippus =

Genus of grasshoppers

Sticthippus is a genus of band-winged grasshoppers in the family Acrididae. There is one described species in Sticthippus, S. californicus.
