= Asemoplus montanus =

Scientific classification
- Kingdom: Animalia
- Phylum: Arthropoda
- Clade: Pancrustacea
- Class: Insecta
- Order: Orthoptera
- Suborder: Caelifera
- Family: Acrididae
- Subfamily: Podisminae
- Genus: Asemoplus
- Species: A. montanus

Binomial name
- Asemoplus montanus (Bruner, 1885)

Species of grasshopper

Asemoplus montanus, the Montana grasshopper, is a species of spur-throated grasshopper in the family Acrididae. It is found in North America.
