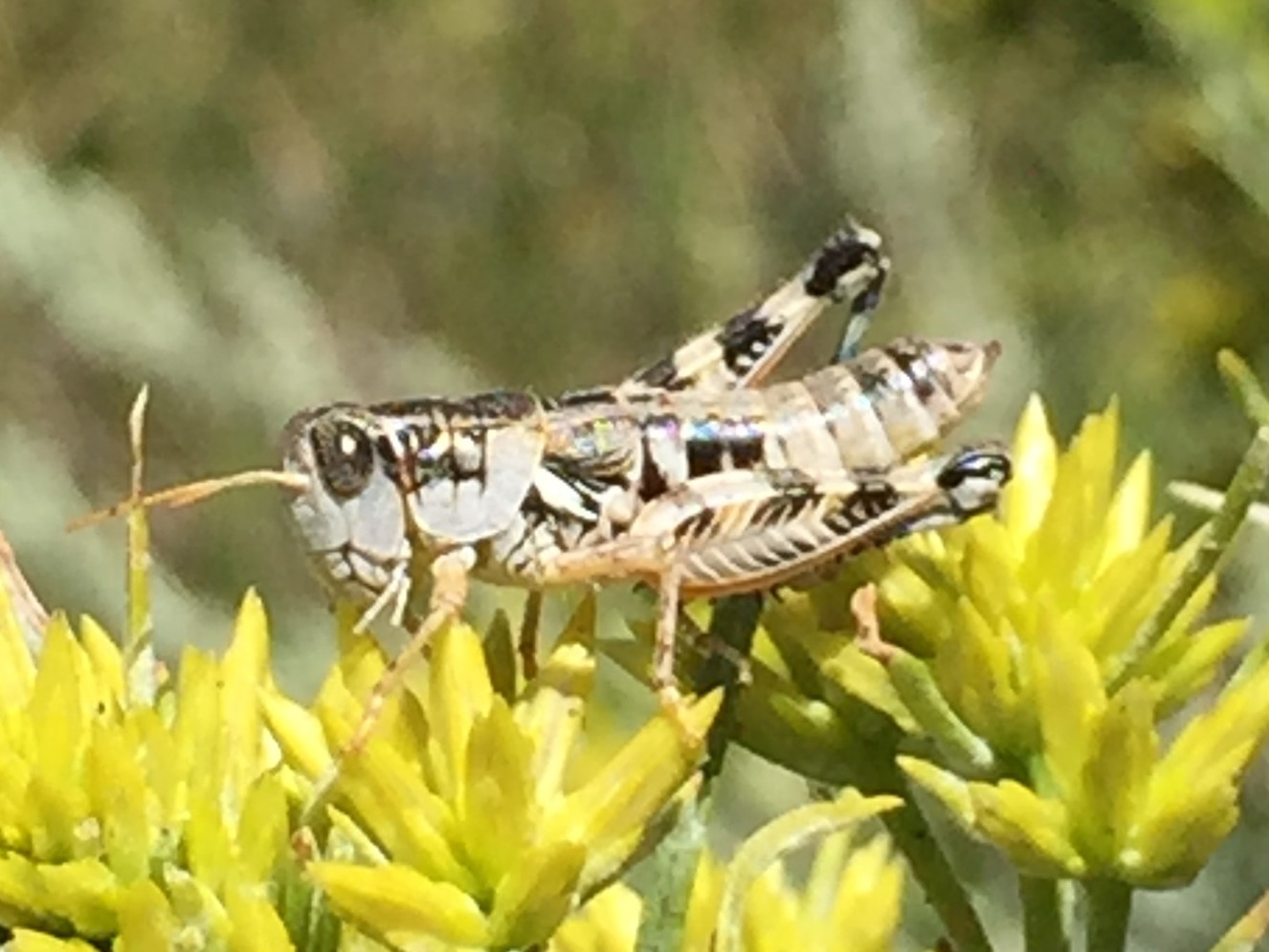

Scientific classification
- Kingdom: Animalia
- Phylum: Arthropoda
- Clade: Pancrustacea
- Class: Insecta
- Order: Orthoptera
- Suborder: Caelifera
- Family: Acrididae
- Genus: Oedaleonotus
- Species: O. orientis

Binomial name
- Oedaleonotus orientis Hebard, 1920

= Oedaleonotus orientis =

Species of grasshopper

Oedaleonotus orientis is a species of spur-throated grasshopper in the family Acrididae. It is found in North America.
