= Samuel Hubbard Scudder =

American entomologist and palaeontologist (1837-1911)

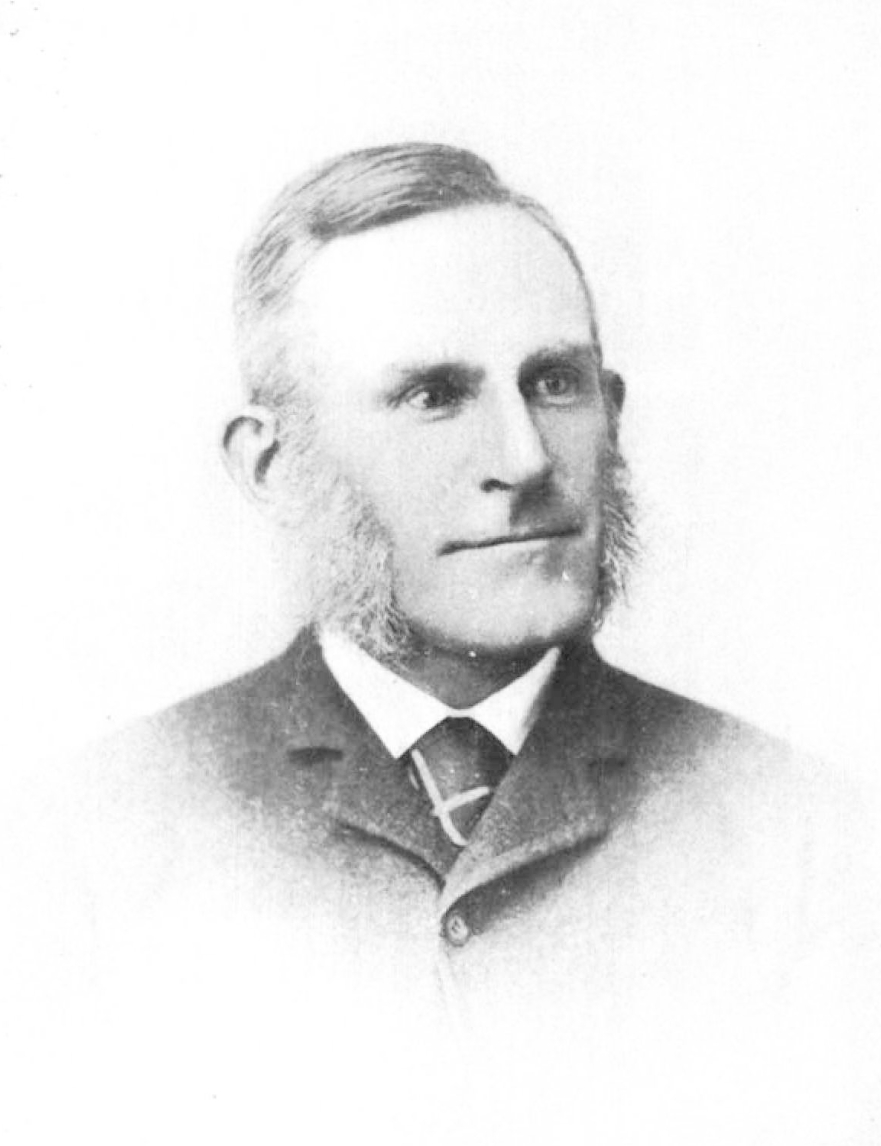
- Born: April 13, 1837; Boston, Massachusetts
- Died: May 17, 1911 (aged 74); Boston, Massachusetts
- Occupations: Entomologist; Paleontologist

Signature
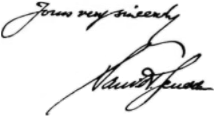

Samuel Hubbard Scudder (April 13, 1837 – May 17, 1911) was an American entomologist and paleontologist. He was a leading figure in entomology during his lifetime and the founder of insect paleontology in America. In addition to fossil insects, he was an authority on butterflies (Lepidoptera) and grasshoppers (Orthoptera).

== Biography ==
Scudder was born on April 13, 1837, in Boston, Massachusetts, the son of Charles Scudder and Sarah Lathrop (Coit) Scudder. His father was a successful merchant, and both parents had Puritan roots dating back to the founding of the Massachusetts Bay Colony in the 1620s. He was raised in a strict Calvinist Congregational household. One of his younger brothers, Horace Scudder, became a noted author and editor of the Atlantic Monthly, while his niece Vida Dutton Scudder was a writer and social activist.

Scudder attended Boston Latin School, and then enrolled in Williams College in 1853 at the age of 16. He studied with naturalist Paul Chadbourne and geologist Ebenezer Emmons. Under their influence, Scudder developed an interest in natural history, especially entomology. He became an ardent collector of butterflies in the nearby Berkshire Hills. By the age of 19, Scudder was committed to pursuing a career studying insects.

Scudder graduated from Williams in 1847 at the head of his class. He then entered the Lawrence Scientific School at Harvard to study under Louis Agassiz, the most influential scientist in America at the time. After studying with Agassiz for four years, he received a Bachelor of Science degree in 1862, and then continued to work for Agassiz for another two years. Around this time, Charles Darwin's theory of evolution was strongly debated in American scientific circles. Agassiz remained a staunch opponent of evolution, while Scudder, after initially siding with Agassiz's view, came gradually to accept Darwin's theory and build it into his entomological work.

Scudder became a leading figure in American entomology, and was especially noted for his work with grasshoppers (Orthoptera), butterflies (Lepidoptera), and insect paleontology. Although he made significant contributions in all these areas, many of his contemporaries felt Scudder was most notable for his study of grasshoppers. He was a world authority on Orthoptera classification, biology, and distribution. In 1862, he wrote his first paper on the topic, describing 115 new species. During his career he wrote 180 papers on grasshoppers and described 106 genera and 630 species. Willis Blatchley said, "to him [Scudder] more than to all his predecessors and contemporaries combined is due our present knowledge of the Orthoptera."

In 1889 Scudder completed his monumental treatise, Butterflies of the Eastern United States and Canada incorporating 30 years of work on the physiology, life history, distribution, and classification of butterflies. This publication cemented his reputation as a leading lepidopterist of his day, and remained a standard and influential work for many years. In addition to numerous scientific papers, Scudder also wrote several popular accounts of butterflies for the general public.

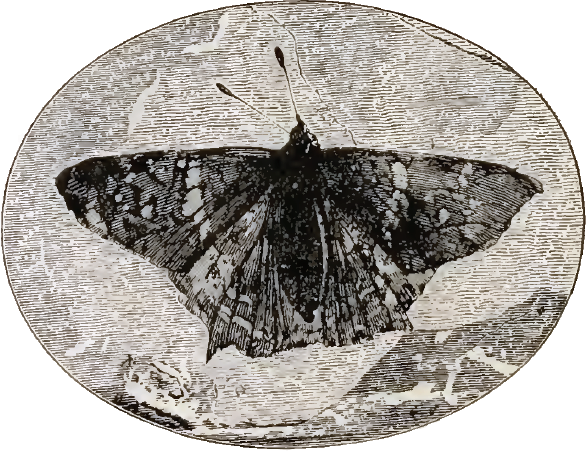
Fossil butterfly, Prodryas persephone, described by Scudder in 1878

In 1865, Scudder wrote his first paper on fossil insects, Devonian Insects of New Brunswick. After the Civil War, the extensive explorations of the United States Geological Survey (USGS) led to the discovery of many fossil insects. From 1886 to 1892, Scudder was employed as the staff paleontologist to analyze and publish these findings for the USGS. His extensive work was summarized in The Fossil Insects of North America (two volumes, 1890) and in 1891 he prepared a valuable index of the fossil insects of the world. Scudder eventually described more than 1100 new species of fossil insects, and wrote 122 papers on the subject.

Beginning in 1862, Scudder had a long association with the Boston Society of Natural History, where he served in various roles, including recording secretary, librarian, custodian, vice president (1874-1880), and president (1880-1887). He also worked as an assistant librarian at Harvard from 1879 to 1882, and held the office of librarian for the American Academy of Arts and Sciences. His interest in librarianship and bibliography led him to compile and publish in 1879 a catalog of scientific serials of all countries from 1633 to 1876. He also published Nomenclator Zoologicus (1882–1884), a seminal and comprehensive list of all generic names in zoology, including insects.

In his other contributions, Scudder was co-founder of the Cambridge Entomological Club and its journal Psyche (1874); general secretary of the American Association for the Advancement of Science (1875), and vice president (1894); cofounder, editor, and guide of the Appalachian Mountain Club (1878); first editor of Science magazine; (1883–1885) and USGS paleontologist (1886–1892). He was elected as a member to the American Philosophical Society in 1878.

In 1867, Scudder married Ethelinda Jane Blatchford, who died in 1872. Their only son, Gardner, was close to his father and accompanied him on many of his field trips. Gardner died of tuberculosis in 1896. At about the same time, Scudder first showed signs of Parkinson's disease, and by 1902, his disability forced him to retire. He gave his personal insect collections to the Museum of Comparative Zoology at Harvard and his library to the Boston Society of Natural History. He died in Boston on May 17, 1911, after several years of seclusion.

== Works ==
Scudder was a prolific writer, publishing 791 papers between 1858 and 1902. His primary focus was the descriptive taxonomy of insects and insect fossils. He also wrote about insect biogeography and paleobiogeography, insect behavior, ontogeny and phylogeny, insect songs, evolution, and insect biology. In addition to his scientific works, Scudder also wrote several popular books and articles on butterflies. Some of his more notable titles include:

- Nomenclator Zoologicus (1862)
- Historical Sketch of the generic names proposed for butterflies, A contribution to systematic nomenclature (1875)
- Butterflies: Their Structure, Changes, and Life Histories (1881)
- Butterflies of the Eastern United States and Canada (1889)
- The Fossil Insects of North America (two volumes, 1890)
- Index to the Known Fossil Insects of the World (1891)
- Tertiary Rhynchophorous Coleoptera of the United States (1893)
- The Life of a Butterfly (1893)
- Frail Children of the Air: Excursions into the World of Butterflies (1895)
- Revision of the Orthopteran Group Melanopli (1897)
- Everyday Butterflies (1899)
- Catalogue of the Described Orthoptera of the United States and Canada (1900)
- Adephagous and Clavicorn Coleoptera from the Tertiary Deposits at Florissant, Colorado (1900)
- Index to North American Orthoptera (1901)

== Additional references ==
- Cockerell, T. D. A. (1911). "Samuel Hubbard Scudder". Science. 34 (872): 338–342. Bibcode:1911Sci....34..338C. doi:10.1126/science.34.872.338. JSTOR 1638227. PMID 17802101.
- Essig, E. O. (1931). A History of Entomology. MacMillan Company. pp. 758–762.
- Leach, William (2013). Butterfly People. Pantheon Books. ISBN 9780375422935.
- Mallis, Arnold (1971). American Entomologists. Rutgers University Press. pp. 185–191. ISBN 9780813506869.
- Mayor, Alfred Goldsborough (1919). "Samuel Hubbard Scudder 1837-1911" (PDF). National Academy of Sciences Biographical Memoirs. 17 (3).
- Smithsonian Institution Archives, Record Unit 7249. "Samuel Hubbard Scudder Papers".
- Sorensen, W. Conner (1995). Brethren of the Net, American Entomology, 1840-1880. University of Alabama Press.
- Sterling, Keir B., ed. (1997). "Scudder, Samuel Hubbard". Biographical Dictionary of American and Canadian Naturalists and Environmentalists. Greenwood Press.
- "Scudder, Samuel Hubbard". Complete Dictionary of Scientific Biography, vol. 12. Charles Scribner's Sons. 2008. p. 264.
