= 2009 in paleontology =

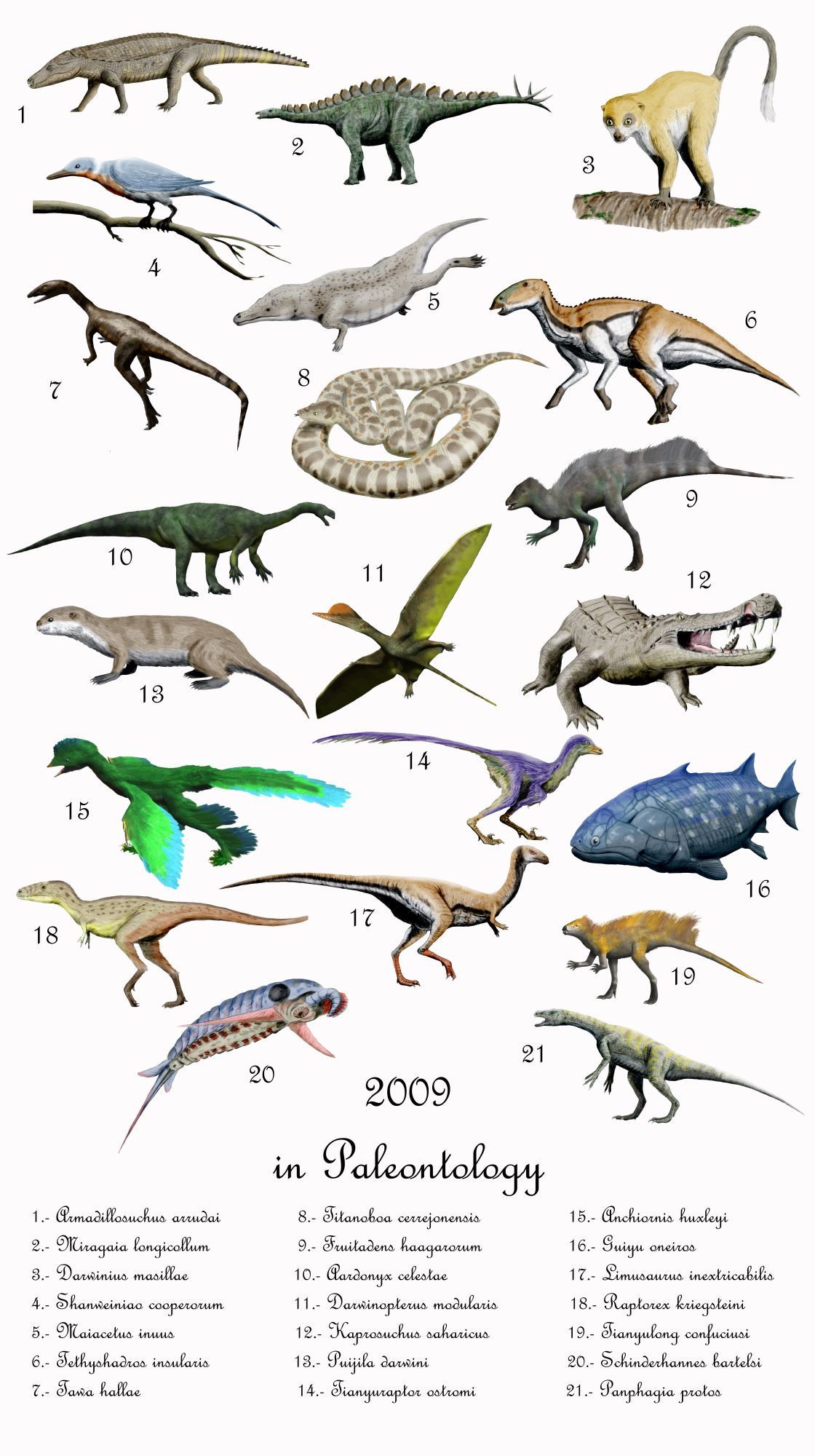
Important taxa described (but not necessarily validly named) in 2009

Paleontology or palaeontology is the study of prehistoric life forms on Earth through the examination of plant and animal fossils. This includes the study of body fossils, tracks (ichnites), burrows, cast-off parts, fossilised feces (coprolites), palynomorphs and chemical residues. Because humans have encountered fossils for millennia, paleontology has a long history both before and after becoming formalized as a science. This article records significant discoveries and events related to paleontology that occurred or were published in the year 2009.

== Cephalopods ==
Three new species of extinct Octopoda discovered in 2009. The species – Keuppia hyperbolaris, Keuppia levante, and Styletoctopus annae – lived about 95 million years ago, and bear a strong resemblance to modern octopuses, suggesting that the Octopoda order has remained relatively unchanged for tens of millions of years. The fossils included evidence of arms, muscles, rows of suckers, ink, and internal gills. The discovery was made by a team led by Dirk Fuchs of the Freie University, which is located at Berlin, Germany. The fossils were found at Hakel and Hadjoula, Lebanon. Various new ammonoid taxa were named, including Ivoites.

Name	Novelty	Status	Authors	Age	Unit	Location	Notes	Images
Keuppia	Gen et sp nov	Valid	Fuchs, Bracchi, & Weis	Upper Cenomanian		Lebanon		Keuppia levante
Styletoctopus	gen et sp nov	Valid	Fuchs, Bracchi, & Weis	Upper Cenomanian		Lebanon		
Ivoites	gen nov	Valid	De Baets, Klug, & Korn	Lower Emsian		Germany		

== Cartilaginous fish ==
Name	Novelty	Status	Authors	Age	Unit	Location	Notes	Images
Gansuselache	Gen. et sp. nov	Valid	Wang et al.	Late Permian	Fangshankou Formation	China	A member of Hybodontoidea. Genus includes new species G. tungshengi.	
Papilionichthys	Gen. et sp. nov	Valid	Grogan; Lund	Carboniferous (Serpukhovian)	Bear Gulch Limestone	United States	A member of Iniopterygidae. The type species is P. stahlae.	
Rainerichthys	Gen. et sp. nov	Valid	Grogan; Lund	Carboniferous (Serpukhovian)	Bear Gulch Limestone	United States	A member of Iniopterygidae. The type species is R. zangerli.	

== Bony fish ==
Name	Status	Authors	Age	Unit	Location	Notes	Images
Aphanius yerevanicus	Valid	Vasilyan; Reichenbacher; Carnevale	Late Miocene		Armenia	A pupfish, a species of Aphanius.	
Carpathoserranoides	Valid	Prokofiev	Oligocene		Czech Republic; Poland	A member of Percoidei. The type species is C. brnoensis; genus also includes C. polonicus.	
Caucasoserranoides	Valid	Prokofiev	Oligocene		Russia	A member of Percoidei. The type species is C. morozkiensis.	
Eophryne	Valid	Carnevale; Pietsch	Eocene (late Ypresian)	Monte Bolca locality	Italy	A frogfish. The type species is Eophryne barbutii.	
Gogosardina	Valid	Choo; Long; Trinajstic	Late Devonian	Gogo Formation	Australia	An early ray-finned fish. Genus includes new species G. coatesi.	
Heddleichthys	Valid	Snitting	Famennian (Late Devonian)	Dura Den Formation	Scotland		
Hendrixella	Valid	Bannikov; Carnevale	Eocene (late Ypresian)	Monte Bolca locality	Italy	A member of Percoidei of uncertain phylogenetic placement. The type species is Hendrixella grandei.	
Langlieria	Valid	Clément; Snitting; Ahlberg	Famennian (Late Devonian)	Evieux Formation	Belgium		
Oligoserranoides	Valid	Prokofiev	Oligocene		Abkhazia; Azerbaijan; Czech Republic; France; Germany; Hungary; Poland; Romania; Russia; Ukraine	A member of Percoidei. The type species is "Smerdis" budensis Heckel (1856); genus also includes "Serranus" comparabilis Daniltshenko (1960).	
Ridewoodichthys	Valid	Taverne	Early Paleocene		Angola	An arowana; a new genus for "Brychaetus" caheni Taverne (1969).	
Ungarnia	Valid	Prokofiev	Oligocene		Romania	A member of Percoidei. The type species is "Serranus" transsylvanicus Bohm (1942).	

- Shimada, K.; Everhart, M.J. (2009). "First record of Anomoeodus (Osteichthyes: Pycnodontiformes) from the Upper Cretaceous Niobrara Chalk of western Kansas". Transactions of the Kansas Academy of Science. 112 (1/2): 98–102. doi:10.1660/062.112.0212. S2CID 83951062.

== Amphibians ==
=== Newly named amphibians ===
Name	Status	Authors	Age	Unit	Location	Notes	Images
Baphetes orientalis	Valid	Milner; Milner; Walsh	Late Carboniferous		Czech Republic		
Cratia	Valid	Báez; Moura; Gómez	Lower Cretaceous	Crato Formation	Brazil	Possible stem neobatrachian	
Eurycephalella	Valid	Báez; Moura; Gómez	Lower Cretaceous	Crato Formation	Brazil	A hyloid	
Nannaroter	Valid	Anderson; Scott; Reisz	Early Permian		USA	The smallest known ostodolepid microsaur	
Nesovtriton	Valid	Skutschas	Turonian	Bissekty Formation	Uzbekistan	A cryptobranchoid salamander	
Regalerpeton	Valid	Zhang; Wang; Jones; Evans	Early Cretaceous	Huajiying Formation	China	A cryptobranchoid salamander	
Spinarerpeton	Valid	Klembara	Early Permian	Boskovice Furrow	Czech Republic	A discosauriscid seymouriamorph	

== Basal reptiles ==
=== Newly named basal reptiles ===
Name	Status	Authors	Discovery year	Age	Unit	Location	Notes	Images
Australothyris	Valid	Modesto; Scott; Reisz		Middle Permian	Tapinocephalus Assemblage Zone	South Africa	A basal parareptile	
Procolina	Valid	Borsuk−Białynicka; Lubka		early Late Olenekian	Czatkowice 1	Poland	A procolophonine procolophonid	

== Turtles ==
=== Newly named turtles ===
Name	Status	Authors	Discovery year	Age	Unit	Location	Notes	Images
Angolachelys	Valid	Mateus; Jacobs; et al. (Note: Mateus, Jacobs, Polcyn, Schulp, Vineyard, Neto, Antunes.)		Turonian (Late Cretaceous)		Angola		
Aurorachelys	Valid	Vandermark; Tarduno; et al. (Note: Vandermark, Tarduno, Brinkman, Cottrell, Mason.)		Late Cretaceous	Strand Fiord Formation	Canada		
Basilochelys	Valid	Tong; Claude; et al. (Note: Tong, Claude, Naksri, Suteethorn, Buffetaut, Khansubba, Wongko, Yuandetkla.)		Late Jurassic/Lower Cretaceous	Phu Kradung Formation	Thailand		
Cedrobaena	Valid	Lyson; Joyce		Paleocene	Fort Union Formation	USA	New genus for "Plesiobaena" putorius Gaffney, 1972	
Chelonoidis alburyorum	Valid	Franz; Franz		Holocene		The Bahamas	A tortoise.	
Chinlechelys	Valid	Joyce et al.		Late Triassic (Norian)	Bull Canyon Formation	United States	A basal member of Testudinata. The type species is C. tenertesta. The genus Chinlechelys was considered to be a junior synonym of the genus Proganochelys by Joyce (2017), though the author maintained C. tenertesta as a distinct species within the latter genus.	
Derrisemys	Junior synonym	Hutchison		Early Paleocene		USA	Junior synonym of Hutchemys.	
Eileanchelys	Valid	Anquetin; Barrett; et al. (Note: Anquetin, Barrett, Jones, Moore-Fay, Evans.)		Middle Jurassic	Kilmaluag Formation	Scotland		
Hutchemys	Valid	Joyce; Revan; Lyson; Danilov		Paleocene	Fort Union Formation; Tullock Formation	USA	A plastomenine softshell turtles	
Kinkonychelys	Valid	Gaffney; Krause; Zalmout		Late Cretaceous	Maevarano Formation	Madagascar		
Palatobaena cohen	Valid	Lyson; Joyce		Maastrichtian	Hell Creek Formation	USA	A baenid	
Peckemys	Valid	Lyson; Joyce		Late Cretaceous	Hell Creek Formation	USA	A baenid	
Plastomenoides	Junior synonym	Hutchison		Early Paleocene		USA	Junior synonym of Hutchemys.	

== Archosauromorphs ==
=== Basal archosauromorphs ===
Newly named basal archosauromorphs
Name	Status	Authors	Age	Unit	Location	Notes	Images
Czatkowiella	Valid	Borsuk−Białynicka; Evans	earliest Late Olenekian	Czatkowice 1	Poland	A long−necked archosauromorph	

== Lepidosauromorphs ==
=== Basal lepidosauromorphs ===
Newly named basal lepidosauromorphs
Name	Status	Authors	Age	Unit	Location	Notes	Images
Pamelina	Valid	Evans	Early Olenekian	Czatkowice 1	Poland	A basal kuehneosaurid	
Sophineta	Valid	Evans; Borsuk−Białynicka	earliest Late Olenekian	Czatkowice 1	Poland	A basal lepidosauromorph	

=== Plesiosaurs ===
- In 2009, in Svalbard, Norway a new pliosaur was found by Jorn Hurum. It currently is codenamed as "Predator X."
- O'Keefe, F. R.; Street, H. P. (2009). "Osteology of the cryptocleidoid plesiosaur Tatenectes laramiensis, with comments on the taxonomic status of the Cimoliasauridae". Journal of Vertebrate Paleontology. 29 (1): 48–57. Bibcode:2009JVPal..29...48O. doi:10.1671/039.029.0118. S2CID 31924376.

Newly named plesiosaurs
Name	Status	Authors	Age	Unit	Location	Notes	Images
Gallardosaurus	Valid	Gasparini	Late Jurassic (Oxfordian)	Jagua Formation	Cuba		Gallardosaurus
Nichollssaura	Valid	Druckenmiller; Russell	Early Cretaceous (Albian)	Clearwater Formation	Canada	Replacement name for Nichollsia Druckenmiller & Russell, 2008, preoccupied by an isopod genus Nichollsia Chopra & Tiwari, 1950	Nichollssaura.
Rarosaurus	Disputed	Kaddumi	Late Cretaceous (Maastrichtian)		Jordan	A member of Polycotylidae. The type species is R. singularis.	

=== Squamates ===
Name	Novelty	Status	Authors	Age	Unit	Location	Notes	Images
Carinodens minalmamar	Sp. nov	Valid	Schulp, Bardet & Bouya	Late Cretaceous (Maastrichtian)		Morocco	A mosasaur.	
Titanoboa	Gen. et sp. nov	Valid	Head et al.	Paleocene	Cerrejón Formation	Colombia	In February, the fossils of 28 individual T. cerrejonensis (Titanoboas) were announced to have been found in the coal mines of Cerrejón, La Guajira, Colombia.	

== Synapsids ==
=== Non-mammalian ===
Name	Status	Authors	Age	Unit	Location	Notes	Images
Protuberum	Valid	Reichel; Schultz; Soares	Middle Triassic (Ladinian)	Santa Maria Formation	Brazil		
Raranimus	Valid	Liu; Rubidge; Li	Middle Permian (Roadian)	Xidagou Formation	China		Raranimus dasahankouensis
Yuanotherium	Valid	Hu; Meng; Clark	Late Jurassic (Oxfordian)	Shishugou Formation	China		

== Plants ==
=== Angiosperms ===
Name	Novelty	Status	Authors	Age	Unit	Location	Notes	Images
Eucalyptolaurus	gen et sp nov	Valid	Coiffard et al.	uppermost Albian-lowermost Cenomanian	Charente-Maritimes	France		

== Relevant research in other sciences ==
=== Evolutionary biology ===
- A study is published that proposes that females from certain taxa use ornaments as a criterion for mate choice because other dimorphic structures, like biological "weaponry" could be used to coerce or force them to mate.
- A study concludes that biotic factors have more pronounced local and short term evolutionary impacts than abiotic factors, which in turn have a more pronounced effect through time and on biodiversity as a whole.

=== Extinction ===
A study noting the effects of the KT mass extinction on Earth's modern biota is published.

=== Geology ===
- Zhang, H.; Wei, Z.-L.; Liu, X.-M.; Li, D. (2009). "Constraints on the age of the Tuchengzi Formation by LA-ICP-MS dating in northern Hebei-western Liaoning, China". Science China Earth Sciences. 52 (4): 461–470. Bibcode:2009ScChD..52..461Z. doi:10.1007/s11430-009-0052-9. S2CID 129751106.

=== Ichnology ===
- Bedatou, E.; Melchor, R.N.; Genise, J.F. (2009). "Complex palaeosol ichnofabrics from Late Jurassic-Early Cretaceous volcaniclastic successions of central Patagonia, Argentina". Sedimentary Geology. 218 (1–4): 74–102. Bibcode:2009SedG..218...74B. doi:10.1016/j.sedgeo.2009.04.005.

=== Paleobiogeography ===
- Pereda-Suberbiola X (2009). "Biogeographical affinities of Late Cretaceous continental tetrapods of Europe: a review". Bulletin de la Société Géologique de France. 180 (1): 57–71. doi:10.2113/gssgfbull.180.1.57.

=== Paleoecology ===
- Nicolas M., Rubidge B.S. (2009). "Changes in Permo-Triassic terrestrial tetrapod ecological representation in the Beaufort Group (Karoo Supergroup) of South Africa". Lethaia. 43: 45–59. doi:10.1111/j.1502-3931.2009.00171.x.

== Footnotes ==
=== Complete author list ===
As science becomes more collaborative, papers with large numbers of authors are becoming more common. To prevent the deformation of the tables, these footnotes list the contributors to papers that erect new genera and have many authors.
