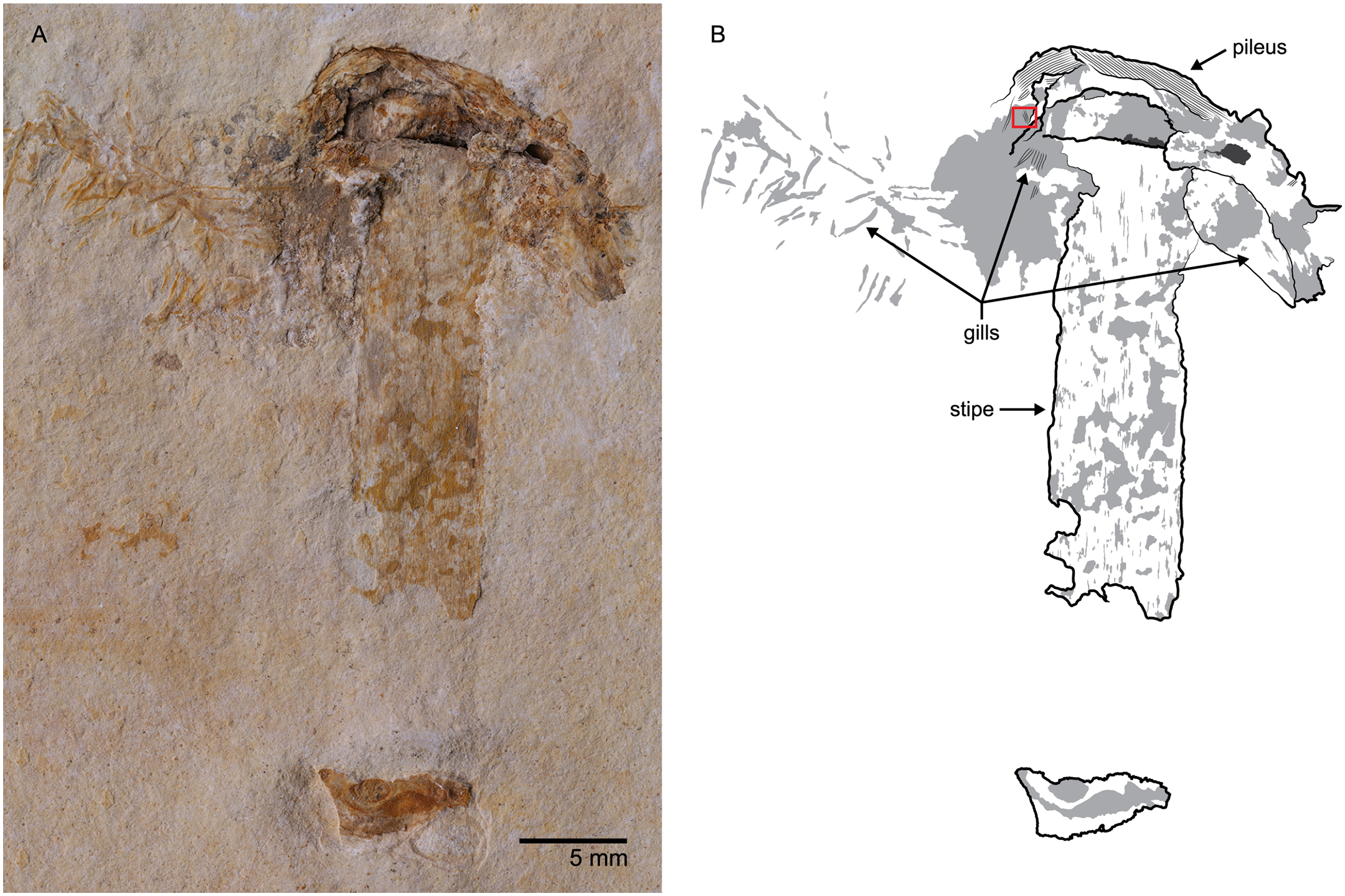
- Holotype of G. magnificus

Scientific classification
- Kingdom: Fungi
- Division: Basidiomycota
- Class: Agaricomycetes
- Order: Agaricales
- Family: incertae sedis
- Genus: †Gondwanagaricites
- Species: †G. magnificus

Binomial name
- †Gondwanagaricites magnificus Heads et al., 2017b

= Gondwanagaricites =

Gondwanagaricites Temporal range: Early Cretaceous, ~115–113 Ma

Extinct genus of fungi

Gondwanagaricites (meaning "Gondwanan mushroom fossil") is an extinct monotypic genus of gilled fungus in the order Agaricales from the Early Cretaceous Crato Formation of Brazil. It contains the single species G. magnificus, and it is the oldest known mushroom fossil known to date.

Gondwanagaricites extends the geological range of mushrooms by around 14 to 21 million years and confirms their presence in Gondwana during the Early Cretaceous.

== Discovery and naming ==
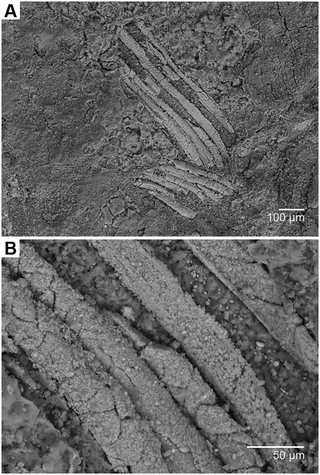
Scanning electron micrographs of the gills of the holotype of G. magnificus

The holotype, URM-88000, was discovered in the Nova Olinda Member of the Crato Formation, Nova Olinda, Brazil and the specimen was sent to the Illinois Natural History Survey Paleontological Collection before being repatriated to the URM Herbarium at the Universidade Federal de Pernambuco in Recife, Brazil.

Gondwanagaricites magnificus was named and described by Heads et al. (2017a), but the PLOS One paper was later retracted because the paper did not meet the requirements of Articles 42.1, 35.1, and 43.3 under the International Code of Nomenclature for Algae, Fungi, and Plants, a MycoBank number for the genus was not given, and the illustration depicting the holotype was not specifically identified. As a result of this, Heads et al. (2017b) published the name instead within the Mycological Process journal.

== Description ==
The holotype slab is roughly 50 × 60 mm, the pileus was measured as 10 millimetres (0.39 in) long, and the stipe was measured to be 34 millimetres (1.3 in) long. The lamellae of Gondwanagaricites were 4.5 millimetres (0.18 in) wide and are broadly attached to a single apex.
