= Ceroma (arachnid) =

Scientific classification
- Domain: Eukaryota
- Kingdom: Animalia
- Phylum: Arthropoda
- Subphylum: Chelicerata
- Class: Arachnida
- Order: Solifugae
- Family: Ceromidae
- Genus: Ceroma; Karsch, 1885

Type species
- Ceroma ornatum Karsch, 1885

Species
- 16, see text

Genus of camel spiders

Ceroma is a genus of ceromid camel spiders, first described by Ferdinand Karsch in 1885.

== Species ==
As of October 2022, the World Solifugae Catalog accepts the following sixteen species:

- Ceroma biseriata Lawrence, 1960 — Angola
- Ceroma hessei Roewer, 1933 — Tanzania
- Ceroma inerme Purcell, 1899 — South Africa (Walvis Bay)
- Ceroma johnstonii Pocock, 1897 — Malawi
- Ceroma katanganum Roewer, 1933 — Congo
- Ceroma langi Hewitt, 1935 — Botswana
- Ceroma leppanae Hewitt, 1914 — South Africa, Zimbabwe
- Ceroma macrognatha Lawrence, 1954 — Tanzania
- Ceroma ornatum Karsch, 1885 — Ethiopia, Kenya, Tanzania, Uganda
- Ceroma pictulum Pocock, 1902 — Namibia, South Africa
- Ceroma sclateri Purcell, 1899 — South Africa
- Ceroma similis Roewer, 1941 — Tanzania
- Ceroma swierstrae Lawrence, 1935 — South Africa
- Ceroma sylvestris Lawrence, 1938 — Zimbabwe
- Ceroma victoriae Benoit, 1965 — Uganda
- Ceroma zomba Roewer, 1933 — Malawi
