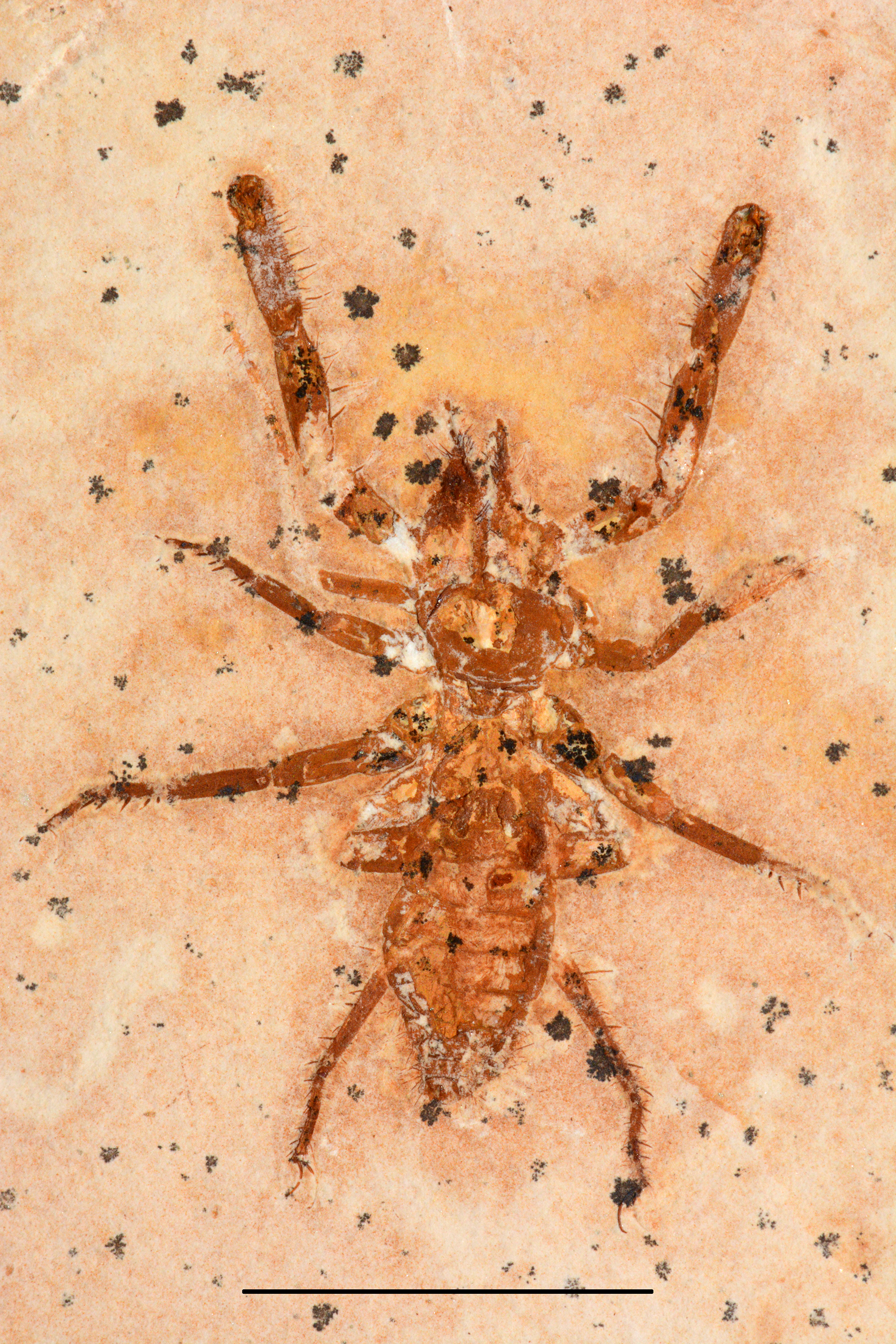
- Specimen MPSC A6696

Scientific classification
- Domain: Eukaryota
- Kingdom: Animalia
- Phylum: Arthropoda
- Subphylum: Chelicerata
- Class: Arachnida
- Order: Solifugae
- Family: Ceromidae
- Genus: †Cratosolpuga; Selden 1996

Type species
- †Cratosolpuga wunderlichi Selden 1996

= Cratosolpuga =

Cratosolpuga Temporal range: Late Aptian ~115–112 Ma

Extinct genus of spider-like animals

Cratosolpuga is an extinct genus of solifuge from the Early Cretaceous Araripe Basin of Brazil. It contains the single species Cratosolpuga wunderlichi. The genus is known from and named after the Crato Formation.
