= Eolepidopterigidae =

Eolepidopterigidae Temporal range: Callovian–Aptian

Scientific classification
- Kingdom: Animalia
- Phylum: Arthropoda
- Class: Insecta
- Order: Lepidoptera
- Superfamily: †Eolepidopterigoidea; Rasnitsyn, 1983
- Family: †Eolepidopterigidae; Rasnitsyn, 1983

Genera
- See text

Extinct family of moths

Eolepidopterigoidea is an extinct superfamily of moths, containing the single family Eolepidopterigidae, although the genus Undopterix is sometimes placed in a separate family Undopterigidae. The type-genus of the family is Eolepidopterix.

== Genera ==
- †Aclemus Zhang et al., 2016 Daohugou, China, Callovian
- †Akainalepidopteron Zhang, Shih, Labandeira & Ren in Zhang et al., 2013 Daohugou, China, Callovian
- †Daiopterix Skalski, 1984 Glushkovo Formation, Russia, Tithonian
- †Dynamilepidopteron Zhang, Shih, Labandeira & Ren in Zhang et al., 2013 Daohugou, China, Callovian
- †Eolepidopterix Rasnitsyn, 1983 Uda Formation, Russia, Oxfordian
- †Gracilepteryx Martins-Neto and Vulcano, 1989 Crato Formation, Brazil, Aptian
- †Grammikolepidopteron Zhang, Shih, Labandeira & Ren in Zhang et al., 2013 Daohugou, China, Callovian
- †Longcapitalis Zhang, Shih, Labandeira & Ren in Zhang et al., 2013 Daohugou, China, Callovian
- †Netoxena Sohn in Sohn et al., 2012 Crato Formation, Brazil, Aptian
- †Palaeolepidopterix Kozlov, 1989 Karabastau Formation, Kazakhtstan, Callovian/Oxfordian
- †Petilicorpus Zhang, Shih, Labandeira & Ren in Zhang et al., 2013 Daohugou, China, Callovian
- †Psamateia Martins-Neto, 2002 Crato Formation, Brazil, Aptian
- †Quadruplecivena Zhang, Shih, Labandeira & Ren in Zhang et al., 2013 Daohugou, China, Callovian
- †Seresilepidopteron Zhang, Shih, Labandeira & Ren in Zhang et al., 2013 Daohugou, China, Callovian
- †Undopterix Skalski, 1979 Glushkovo Formation, Russia, Tithonian; Crato Formation, Brazil, Aptian
