= Cratoraricrus =

Cratoraricrus Temporal range: Aptian

Scientific classification
- Kingdom: Animalia
- Phylum: Arthropoda
- Subphylum: Myriapoda
- Class: Chilopoda
- Order: Scolopendromorpha
- Family: Scolopendridae
- Genus: †Cratoraricrus; Wilson, 2003

Type species
- †Cratoraricrus oberlii Wilson, 2003

Extinct genus of centipedes

Cratoraricrus is an extinct genus of centipedes in the family Scolopendridae containing the species Cratoraricrus oberlii. It was described by the paleontologist Heather M. Wilson in 2003, becoming the fourth known Mesozoic centipede. The Nova Olinda Member of the Early Cretaceous Brazilian Crato Formation, where the remains were found, is known for its excellent preservation of terrestrial arthropods. These include other centipede genera, which are otherwise rare in the fossil record. The type specimen is 54 millimeters (2.1 in) long, with parts of the head missing, making the presence or absence of eyes unclear. The paleoenvironment in which it was preserved may have been subject to hypersaline conditions. A variety of other arthropods have been discovered from the Crato Formation, along with fishes, pterosaurs, turtles, and various types of plants.

== Discovery and naming ==
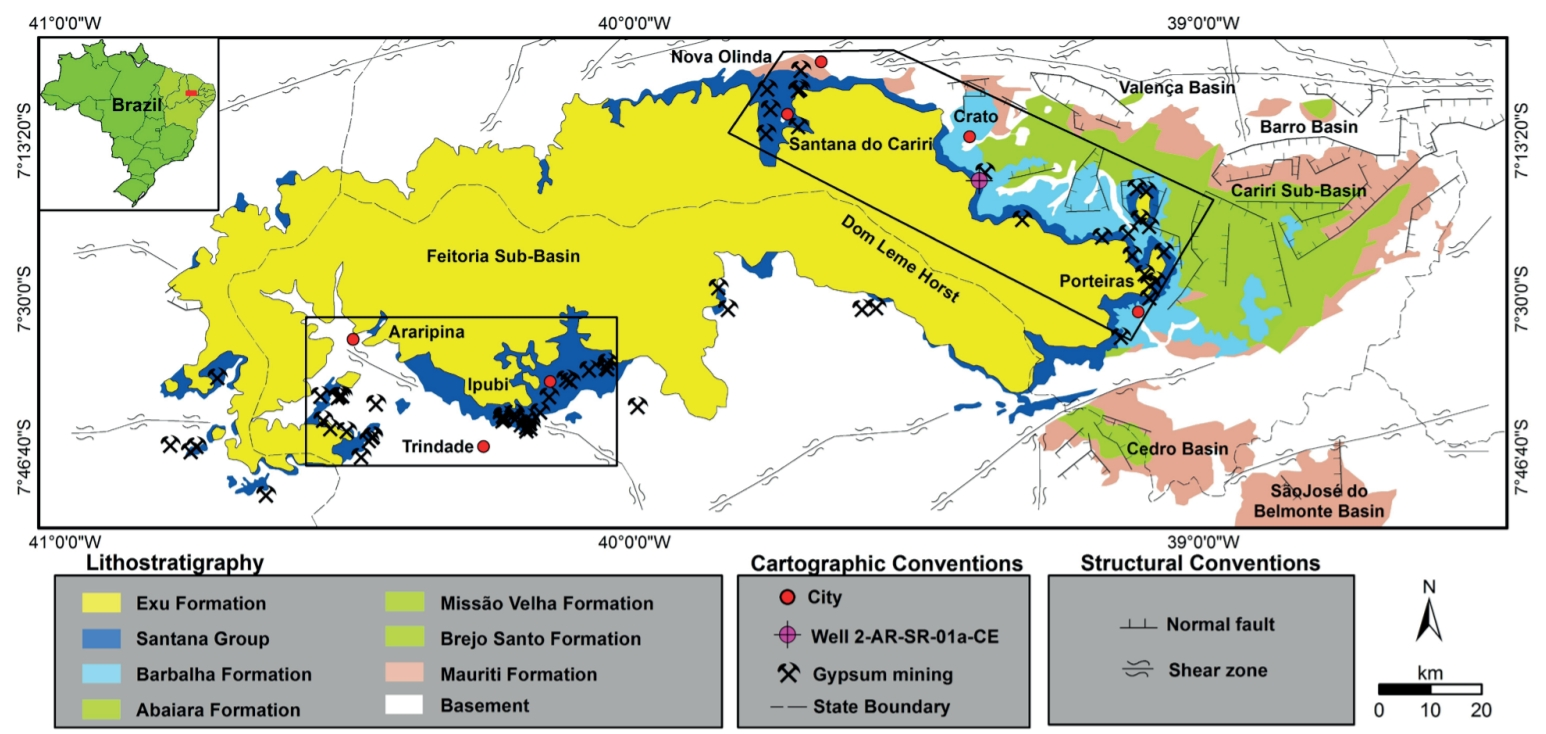
Extent of the Santana Group, to which the Crato Formation belongs, in blue

Cratoraricrus was described by the paleontologist Heather M. Wilson in 2003. The type species was named Cratoraricrus oberlii, with the genus name in reference to the Early Cretaceous Brazilian Crato Formation, where the remains were found, and the Latin words rar (lit. 'thin') and crus (lit. 'leg'). The specific epithet was in honor of its collector, Urs Oberli. Wilson remarked on the overall rareness of centipedes in the fossil record, but described the Nova Olinda Member (the part of the Crato Formation where Cratoraricrus was found) as a Konservat-Lagerstätte for terrestrial arthropods, where three out of the four known Mesozoic centipede taxa at the time had been found.

== Description ==
The type specimen of Cratoraricrus oberlii was noted for its bisegmented tarsi (the furthest part of the leg from the body), paramedian (near the middle of the body) sternal grooves, and slim ultimate legs. The preserved remains include the head and 21 leg-bearing segments. From the front of the head to the end of the last segment, it is 54 millimeters (2.1 in) long. Parts of the tergite (upper portions) of segments 18, 19, and 20 are missing. Parts of the head and the tergite of the forcipules (venom-injecting organs) are also missing, revealing internal structures and the mouthparts under the head, although most of the head has been filled in by minerals, obstructing the rest of the internal and ventral portions. Parts of the mandibles and a few pieces of the right antenna are preserved, while the presence or absence of eyes is unclear.

Each leg possesses six podomeres (segments), of which only three are preserved for the ultimate legs. One of the podomeres of the ultimate legs, known as the prefemur, was interpreted as having had numerous spines. All podomeres are long and slender, with a length approximately five times their width. Wilson stated that Cratoraricrus, like all known Mesozoic centipedes, is indistinguishable from modern centipedes.

== Classification ==
Wilson placed Cratoraricrus in the family Scolopendridae within the order Scolopendromorpha. In 2006, Cratoraricrus oberlii was reported to be one of only two scolopendrid centipede species known from the Mesozoic (along with Velocipede betimari) and the better understood of the two. A 2025 catalog of fossil centipedes published in the journal Arthropoda lists one additional record of indeterminate scolopendrid remains from Burmese amber, but it also lists Velocipede as incertae sedis. Jahnavi Joshi and K. Praveen Karanth of the Indian Institute of Science selected Cratoraricrus as one of three fossil centipedes used to calibrate their molecular clock estimates of the diversification of scolopendrid centipedes of South India.

== Paleoecology ==
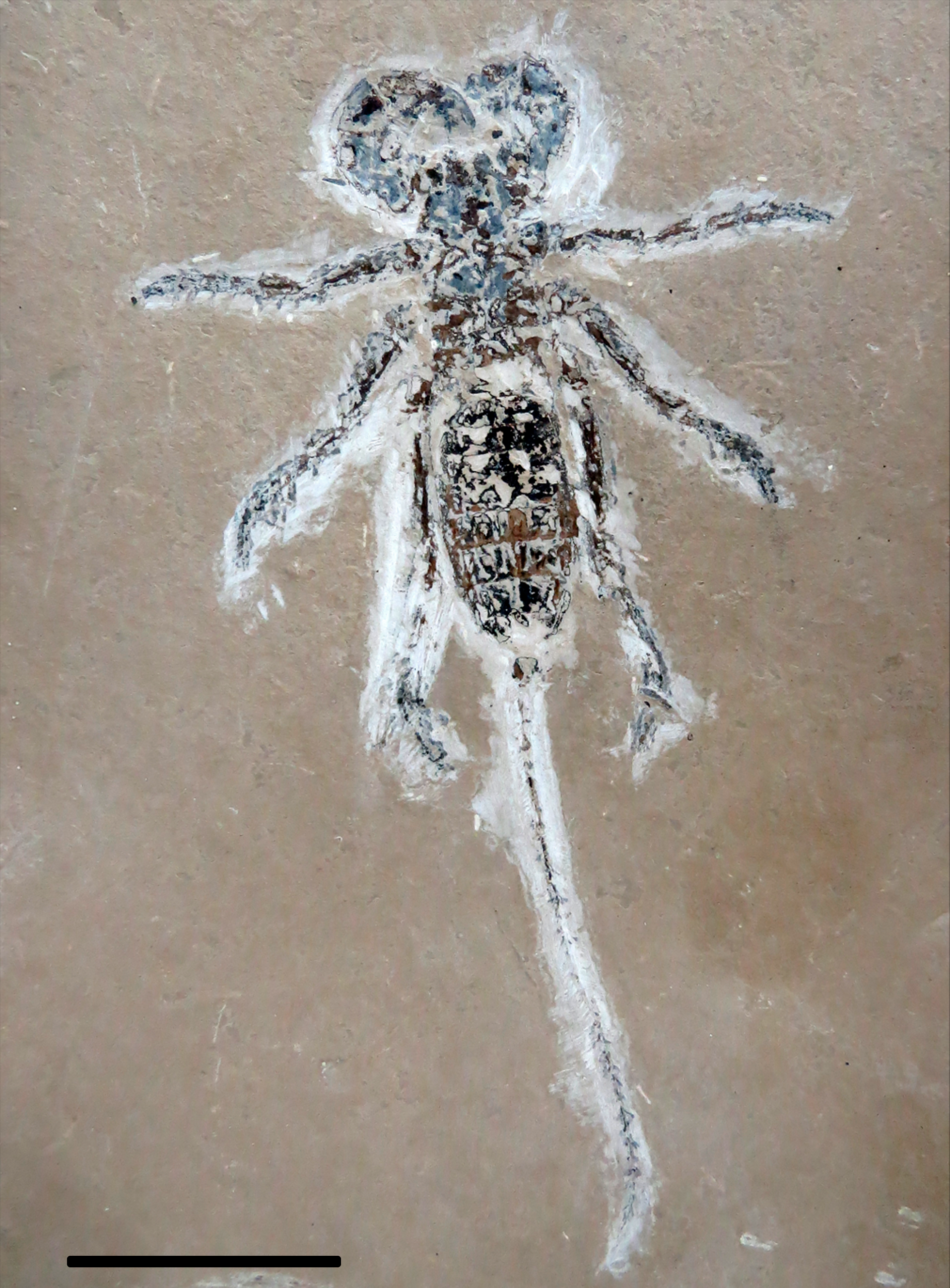
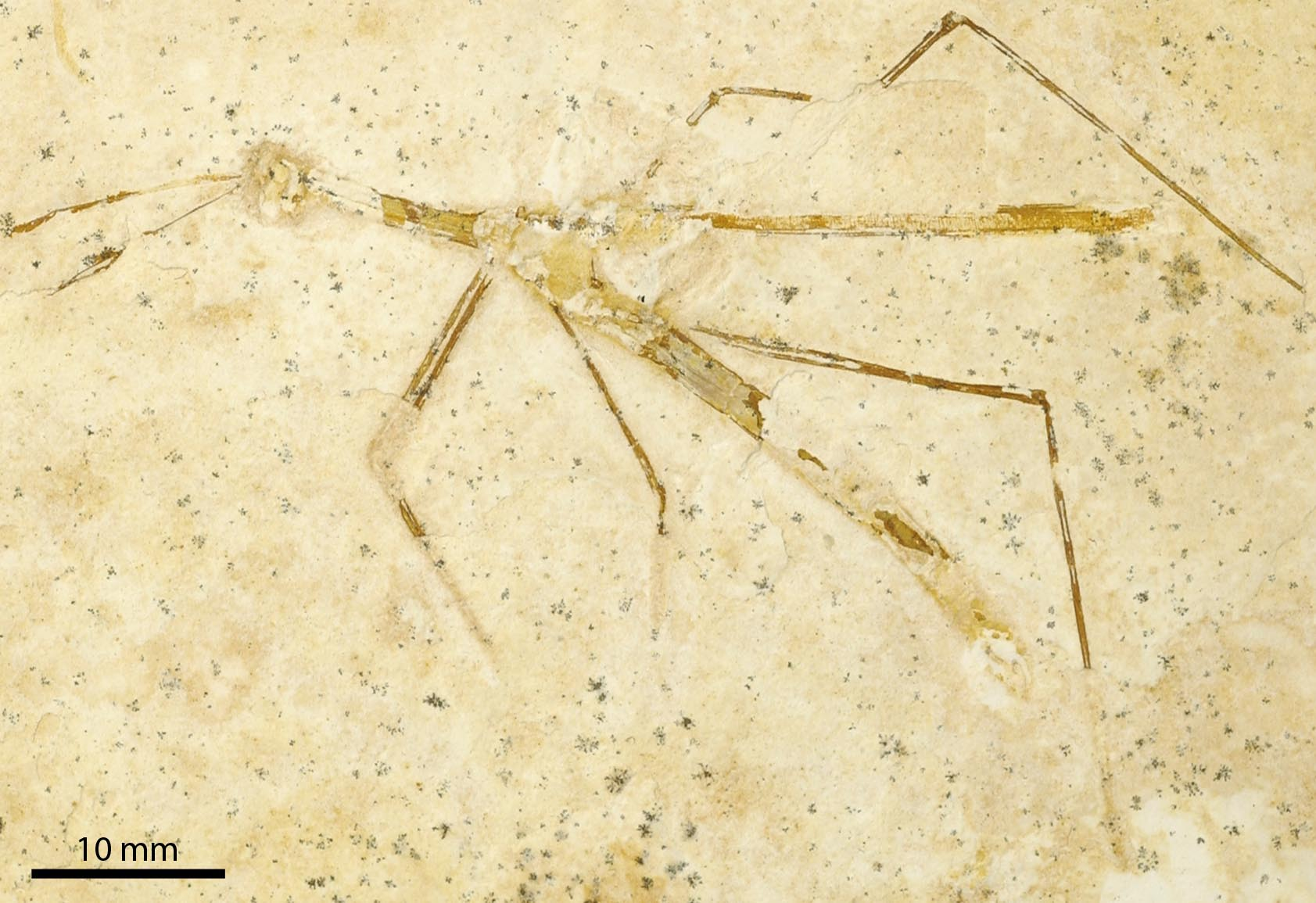
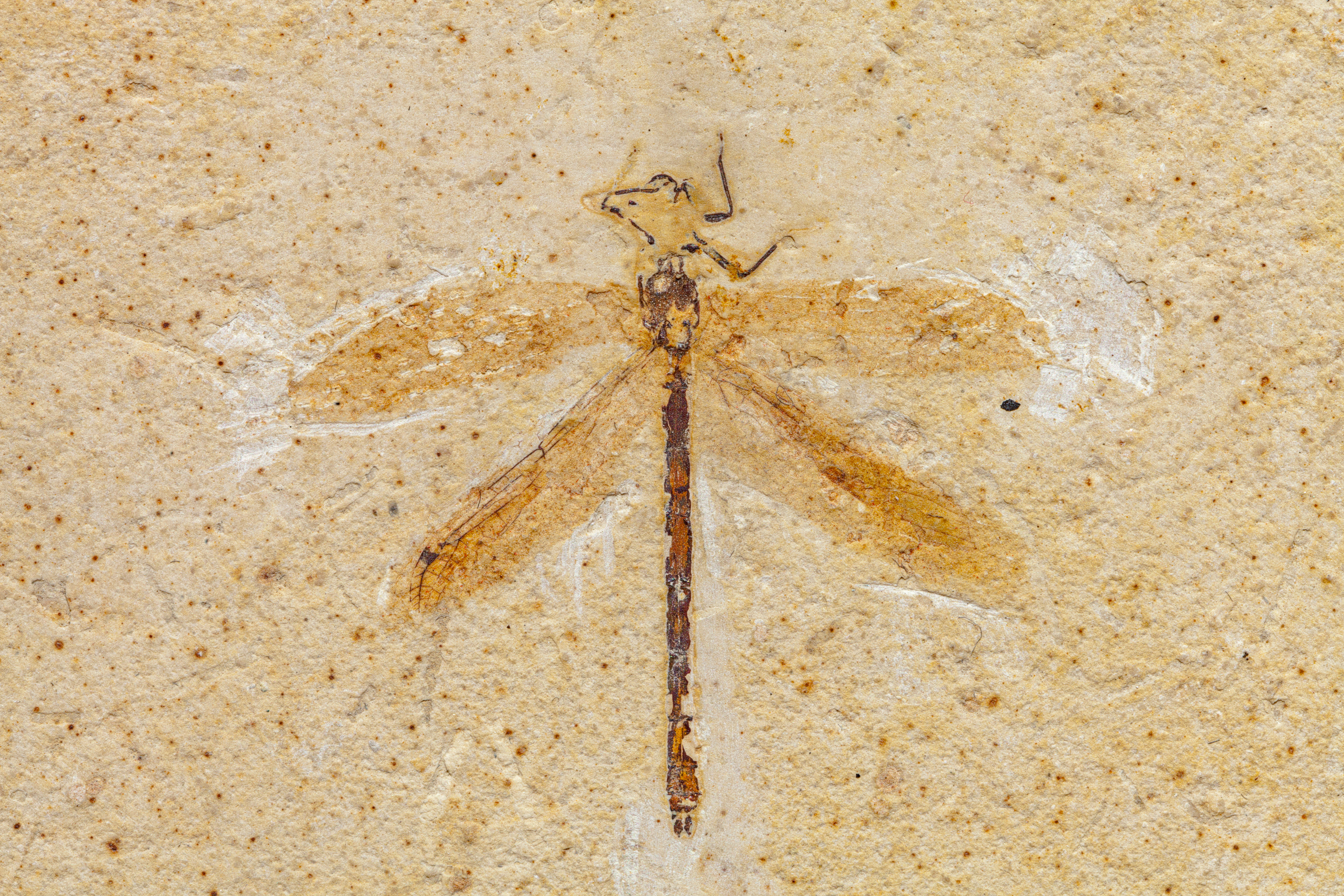
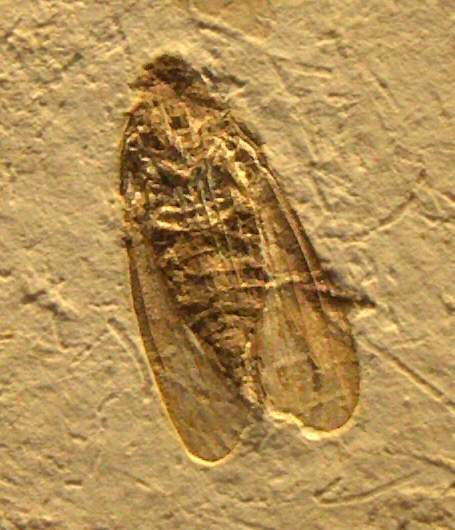
Other arthropods collected from the Crato Formation; from top left, a whip scorpion, an orthopteran, an odonate, and a hemipteran

The paleoenvironment of the Crato Formation has been variously interpreted as a saline lake, a marine environment, and a freshwater environment subject to frequent hypersaline and alkaline conditions. The Crato Formation is dated to the Aptian, while the Nova Olinda Member has been suggested to be latest Aptian to early Albian in age. Other arthropods include the centipedes Velocipede and Fulmenocursor; many winged insects; and rarely spiders, whip spiders, whip scorpions, scorpions, and a japygid (a member of the order Diplura of non-insect hexapods). Some of the best-preserved non-arthropod remains include fishes, pterosaurs, and turtles. Plants include angiosperms, ferns, and gymnosperms, and there is evidence of a wide range of interactions between plants and insects, including insect galls, feeding along the leaf margin, leaf mining, oviposition, and skeletonization (stripping away of most of the leaf). Stromatolites as high as 100 centimeters (3.3 ft) have been found in one Nova Olinda quarry.
