= Gracilepteryx =

Gracilepteryx Temporal range: Late Aptian ~115–113 Ma

Scientific classification
- Kingdom: Animalia
- Phylum: Arthropoda
- Clade: Pancrustacea
- Class: Insecta
- Order: Lepidoptera
- Family: †Eolepidopterigidae
- Genus: †Gracilepteryx; Martins-Neto & Vulcano 1989
- Species: †G. pulchra

Binomial name
- †Gracilepteryx pulchra Martins-Neto & Vulcano 1989

Single-species extinct genus of moths

Gracilepteryx is an extinct genus of moths within the family Eolepidopterigidae, containing one species, Gracilepteryx pulchra, which is known from the Late Aptian Crato Formation of the Araripe Basin in northeastern Brazil.
