= Ceromella =

Scientific classification
- Domain: Eukaryota
- Kingdom: Animalia
- Phylum: Arthropoda
- Subphylum: Chelicerata
- Class: Arachnida
- Order: Solifugae
- Family: Ceromidae
- Genus: Ceromella; Roewer, 1933

Type species
- Ceromella focki (Kraepelin, 1914)

Species
- 3, see text

Genus of camel spiders

Ceromella is a genus of ceromid camel spiders, first described by Carl Friedrich Roewer in 1933.

== Species ==
As of October 2022, the World Solifugae Catalog accepts the following three species:

- Ceromella focki (Kraepelin, 1914) — Namibia
- Ceromella hepburni (Hewitt, 1923) — South Africa
- Ceromella pallida (Pocock, 1900) — South Africa
