= Psamateia =

Scientific classification
- Kingdom: Animalia
- Phylum: Arthropoda
- Clade: Pancrustacea
- Class: Insecta
- Order: Lepidoptera
- Family: †Eolepidopterigidae
- Genus: †Psamateia; Martins-Neto, 2002
- Species: †P. calipsa

Binomial name
- †Psamateia calipsa Martins-Neto, 2002

Single-species extinct genus of moths

Psamateia is an extinct genus of moths within the family Eolepidopterigidae, containing one species, Psamateia calipsa, which is known from the Crato Formation in Brazil.
