= Netoxena =

Netoxena Temporal range: Late Aptian ~115–113 Ma

Scientific classification
- Kingdom: Animalia
- Phylum: Arthropoda
- Clade: Pancrustacea
- Class: Insecta
- Order: Lepidoptera
- Family: †Eolepidopterigidae
- Genus: †Netoxena; Sohn in Sohn et al., 2012
- Species: †N. nana

Binomial name
- †Netoxena nana (Martins-Neto 1999)

Single-species extinct genus of moths

Netoxena is an extinct genus of moths within the family Eolepidopterigidae, containing one species, Netoxena nana, which is known from the Crato Formation of the Araripe Basin in northeastern Brazil. Its generic name was originally Xena Martins-Neto (1999); however, this name turned out to be preoccupied by a genus of chloropid flies Xena Nartshuk (1964). A replacement generic name Netoxena was coined in 2012.
