= Eolepidopterix =

Scientific classification
- Kingdom: Animalia
- Phylum: Arthropoda
- Clade: Pancrustacea
- Class: Insecta
- Order: Lepidoptera
- Family: †Eolepidopterigidae
- Genus: †Eolepidopterix; Rasnitsyn, 1983
- Species: †E. jurassica

Binomial name
- †Eolepidopterix jurassica Rasnitsyn, 1983

Single-species extinct genus of moths

Eolepidopterix is an extinct genus of moths within the family Eolepidopterigidae, containing one species, Eolepidopterix jurassica, which is known from Russia. The fossil remains are dated to the Upper Jurassic-Lower Cretaceous.
