= Toreus =

Scientific classification
- Domain: Eukaryota
- Kingdom: Animalia
- Phylum: Arthropoda
- Subphylum: Chelicerata
- Class: Arachnida
- Order: Solifugae
- Family: Ceromidae
- Genus: Toreus; Purcell, 1903
- Species: T. capensis

Binomial name
- Toreus capensis (Purcell, 1899)

Genus of camel spiders

Toreus is a monotypic genus of ceromid camel spiders, first described by William Frederick Purcell in 1903. Its single species, Toreus capensis is distributed in South Africa.
