= Cratia =

Cratia Temporal range: Aptian ~112 Ma

Scientific classification
- Domain: Eukaryota
- Kingdom: Animalia
- Phylum: Chordata
- Class: Amphibia
- Order: Anura
- Suborder: Neobatrachia
- Genus: †Cratia; Báez et al. 2009

Type species
- †C. gracilis Báez et al. 2009

Extinct genus of amphibians

Cratia is an extinct frog which existed in Brazil during the Early Cretaceous (Aptian). Fossils were discovered in and named after the Crato Formation. It was named by Ana M. Báez, Geraldo J.B. Moura and Raúl O. Gómez in 2009, and the type species is Cratia gracilis.
