= Undopterix =

Scientific classification
- Kingdom: Animalia
- Phylum: Arthropoda
- Clade: Pancrustacea
- Class: Insecta
- Order: Lepidoptera
- Family: †Eolepidopterigidae
- Genus: †Undopterix; Skalski, 1979

Species
- †Undopterix sukatshevae Skalski, 1979; †Undopterix cariensis Martins-Neto and Vulcano, 1989

Extinct genus of moths

Undopterix is an extinct genus of moths within the family Eolepidopterigidae, containing two species. Undopterix sukatshevae is known from Russia. The fossil remains are dated to the Lower Cretaceous.

The second species, Undopterix cariensis is known from the Crato Formation in Brazil.

== Taxonomy ==
Undopterix was initially classified in the Micropterigidae, but was later transferred to the Eolepidopterigidae family. It was designated as the type-genus for the new family Undopterigidae by Kozlov in 1988, but this is disputed.
