= Eurycephalella =

Eurycephalella Temporal range: Aptian ~112 Ma

Scientific classification
- Kingdom: Animalia
- Phylum: Chordata
- Class: Amphibia
- Order: Anura
- Superfamily: Hyloidea
- Genus: †Eurycephalella; Báez et al. 2009

Type species
- †E. alcinae Báez et al. 2009

Extinct genus of amphibians

Eurycephalella is an extinct genus of frogs which existed in what is now Brazil during the Early Cretaceous (Aptian). It was named by Ana M. Báez, Geraldo J.B. Moura and Raúl O. Gómez in 2009, and the type species is Eurycephalella alcinae.

== Discovery ==
Eurycephalella was discovered within the limestone predominant Crato Formation of the Araripe Basin in northeastern Brazil. The specimen is the partial skeleton of an adult, and is in the collection of the Museum of Paleontology in Santana do Cariri.

Although the fossil was originally assigned to the genus Arariphrynus (Leal and Brito, 2006), it was later changed to Eurycephalella.
