= Ceromidae =

Scientific classification
- Domain: Eukaryota
- Kingdom: Animalia
- Phylum: Arthropoda
- Subphylum: Chelicerata
- Class: Arachnida
- Order: Solifugae
- Family: Ceromidae; Roewer, 1933

Family of spider-like organisms

Ceromidae is a family of solifuges, first described by Carl Friedrich Roewer in 1933.

== Genera ==
As of September 2022, the World Solifugae Catalog accepts the following four genera:

- Ceroma Karsch, 1885
- Ceromella Roewer, 1933
- Toreus Purcell, 1903
- †Cratosolpuga Selden, 1996
