= Nova Olinda, Ceará =

Municipality in Ceará, Brazil

Nova Olinda
- Municipality
- The Municipality of Nova Olinda
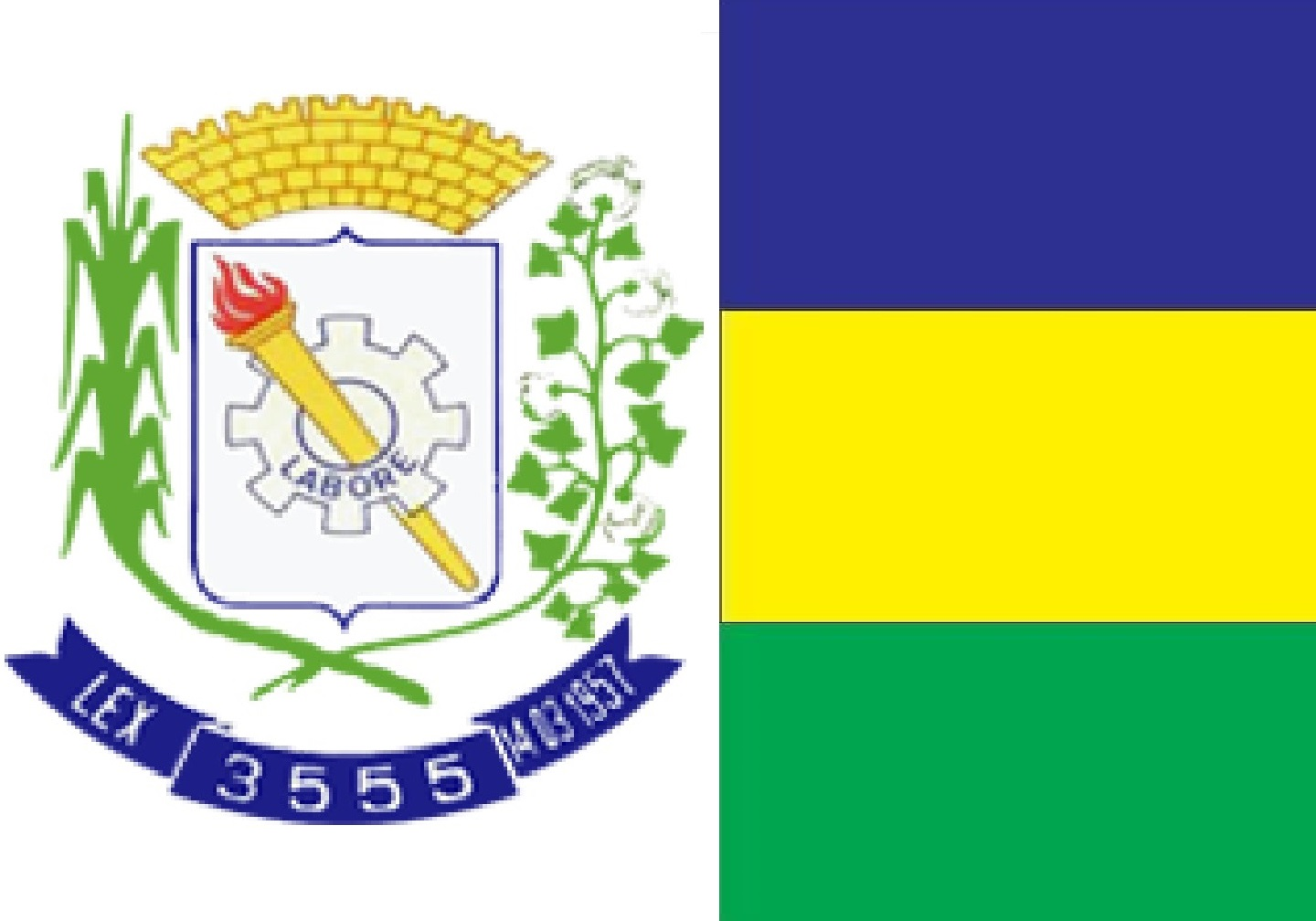
- Flag

- Location of Nova Olinda in the State of Ceará
- Coordinates: 07°05′31″S 39°40′51″W
- Country: Brazil
- Region: Northeast
- State: Ceará
- Founded: April 14, 1957

Government
  - Mayor: Ítalo Brito Alencar (PT)

Area
  - Total: 284.404 km^{2} (109.809 sq mi)
- Elevation: 230 m (740 ft)

Population (2020)
  - Total: 15,684
  - Density: 55.147/km^{2} (142.83/sq mi)
- Time zone: UTC−3 (BRT)
- HDI (2000): 0.637 – medium
- Website: www.novaolinda.ce.gov.br

Nova Olinda is a municipality of the Northeastern state of Ceará in Brazil. It is located in the micro-region of Cariri, mesoregion of Southern Cearense, Metropolitan Region of Cariri. Its population is 15,798 inhabitants, as estimated by the IBGE in 2021.[2] It was created in 1957 and its area is 284,404 km^{2}.

== History ==
Originally it was called Tapera, but due to its geographical aspect a Pernambuco missionary changed the toponym to Nova Olinda. Belonging to the municipality of Santana do Cariri the village then became a district by virtue of the decree n° 1256, on December 4, 1933. Nova Olinda was elevated to municipality by law n° 3,555, on March 14, 1957, and installed on April 26 of the same year. District created with the name Nova Olinda ex-village, by decree nº 1256, of 04–121933, subordinated to the municipality of Santana do Cariri. In administrative division referring to the year 1933, the district of Nova Olinda appears in the municipality of Santana do Cariri. Thus remaining in territorial divisions dated 31-XII-1936 and 31-XII-1937. By state decree-law nº 448, of 12–20–1938, the municipality of Santana do Cariri changed its name to Santanópole. In territorial division dated 1-VII-1950, the district of Nova Olinda, appears in the municipality of Santanópole ex-Santana do Cariri. By state law nº 1153, of 11–22–1953, the municipality of Santanópole is renamed Santana do Cariri. In territorial division dated 1-VII-1955, the district of Nova Olinda, appears in the municipality of Santanópole ex-Santana do Cariri. Elevated to the category of municipality with the name of Nova Olinda, by state law nº 3555, of 03–14–1957, dismembered from Santana do Cariri. Headquarters in the old district of Nova Olinda. Made up of the headquarters district. Installed on 14–06–1957. In territorial division dated 1-VII-1960, the municipality is made up of the district headquarters. So staying in the territorial division dated 2005.

=== Distinguish People ===
- Emerson Ceará: He is an important figure for the city. He is a comedian and has a YouTube channel where he posts his videos that have many views.
- Espedito Seleiro: He is an important figure for the city, because his leather products is well known at the whole NE Rehion.
- Luan Vitalino: Luan Vitalino is a young Brazilian Social-Liberal politician and environmental activist, known for his commitment to preserving the environment, he has emerged as an influential voice in contemporary politics, especially on issues related to sustainability and individual freedom.

== Geography ==
=== Climate ===
Tropical Hot Sub-humid, tropical Hot Semi-arid Mild, tropical Hot Semi-arid. Average temperature of 24 to 26 °C. The rainy season occurs between January and May.

=== Vegetation ===
Thorny Deciduous Forest, Tropical Rainfall Evergreen Forest, Rainfall-Nebular Tropical Evergreen Forest, and Xeromorphic Tropical Evergreen Forest.

== Tourism ==
Nova Olinda offers a range of cultural and natural attractions, including archaeology, folklore, handicrafts, and local landscapes. The municipality also maintains the Church of Saint Sebastião, which reflects the architectural style present in its historic buildings.

It is one the 65 cities inducing national tourism by the Ministry of Tourism, being one of the four cities located on Ceará:

- Aracati
- Fortaleza
- Jijoca de Jericoacoara
- Nova Olinda

=== Main Tourist Attractions ===
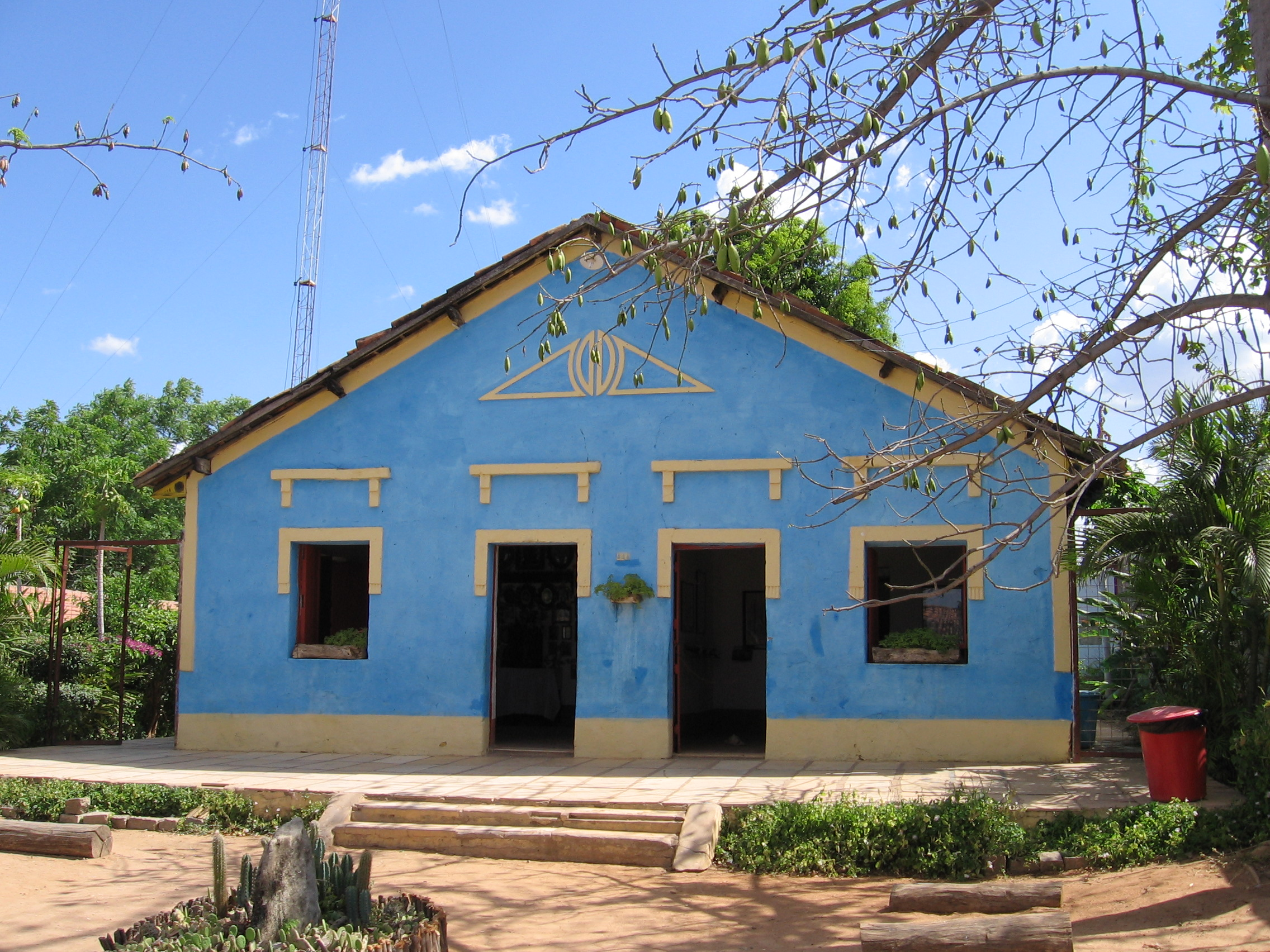
- Casa Grande - Nova Olinda, CE
  Casa Grande Fundation: Casa Grande is a project designed to exercise youth protagonism. Many children are involved in this cultural project that preserves much of Cariri's culture, passing on all the knowledge they have acquired. There is a collection of DVDs, comics and many other important artifacts for the region. The site also has a theater and a restaurant.
- Violeta Arraes Theater: The theater opened on November 19, 2002, and was a gift for children in the community to have access to culture and education. The theater takes its name in honor of the sertanejo Violeta Arraes and the architectural ensemble of the sugarcane mills in the Cariri region. The theater is a popular tourist spot in the region, sought after by hundreds of people and enchants with its construction and ancient stories.
- Museum Ciclo do Couro: In this museum you will find the entire history of Espedito Seleiro and its memory, creations and art. It is a place of great cultural wealth that presents all the aesthetics of the sertanejo man.
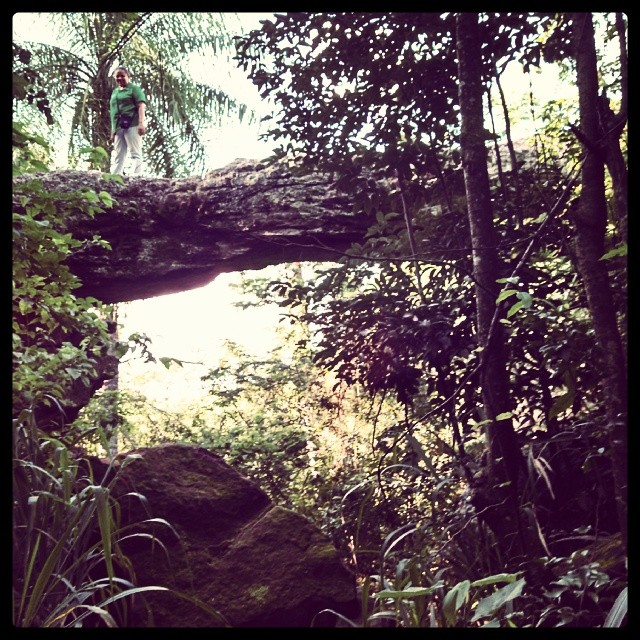
- Ponte de Pedra - Nova Olinda, CE
  Ponte de Pedra: Geosite Ponte de Pedra is located in Sítio Olho D'água de Santa Bárbara is a remarkable site in the landscape, with a beautiful panoramic view, located in the municipality of Nova Olinda, on the descent of Chapada do Araripe. It is represented by a natural rock formation that resembles a bridge, as it covers the gap of a stream that only has water in times of rain. It delimits an area between the Chapada de Araripe, with its abundant forest and the culture of collecting pequi, and the Sertão, which can be seen on the way down. The bridge probably served as a trail for the ancient populations, both for the Indians and for the former cowboys who colonized the region. Near the bridge, there are archaeological remains of prehistoric populations. There are engravings and cave paintings, as well as occasional finds of ceramic remains and lithic material used by the ancient Kariri inhabitants. It is one of the places where the geological and natural past can be studied together with human history.

== Education ==
The municipality has a considerable rate of schooling, the number of approval (97,60 %) according to the latest research exceeds the levels of failure (1,81 %) and abandonment (0,59 %). The number of teachers with higher education is considerable, which directly impacts the educational levels of the municipality. The number of federal schools with equipment such as science and computer laboratories and libraries is lower than the state schools.

=== List Of Educational Institutions ===
- EEFM PADRE LUIS FILGUEIRAS
- AVELINO FEITOSA EEF
- PADRE CRISTIANO COELHO EEF
- JOSE ALENCAR ALVES EEF
- CRIANCA ESPERANCA EEI
- JOSE LIBERALINO DA SILVA EEIEF
- ALVIN ALVES EEIEF
- REUNIDAS SANTO EXPEDITO EEF
- 15 DE NOVEMBRO EEIEF
- ADELIA MILFONT EEI
- ANTONIO LAURENTINO ESC MUL
- ESCOLA MUNICIPAL DE ENSINO FUNDAMENTAL PROFESSOR BELEM
- CONCEICAO DE BRITO ESC MUL
- ESCOLA MUNICIPAL FRANCISCO LEAO DE ARAUJO
- ESCOLA MUNICIPAL JOAO LEAL
- JOAO PAULO II ESC MUL
- ESCOLA MUNICIPAL DE ENSINO FUNDAMENTAL JOAQUIM ANTONIO DE SANTANA
- JORGE FURTADO ESC MUL
- JOSE DE ALENCAR ESC MUL
- ESCOLA MUNICIPAL DE ENSINO FUNDAMENTAL JOSE DE ALENCAR
- ESCOLA MUNICIPAL OTON PATROCINIO
- ESCOLA MUNICIPAL PEDRO ANTONIO
- ESCOLA MUNICIPAL DOM QUINTINO
- ESCOLA MUNICIPAL VISCONDE DE CAIRU
- PROGRAMA DE ERRADICACAO DO TRABALHO INFANTIL - PETI
- ESCOLA MUNICIPAL ANTONIA MARIA DA CONCEICAO
- ASSOCIACAO DOS EDUCADORES DE NOVA OLINDA - CENTRO DE EDUCACAO BASICA EEIEFM
- POLO DE ATENDIMENTO ANTONIO JEREMIAS PEREIRA
- UNIVERSO DO SABER EEIEF
- LAURENIO FEITOSA EEIEF
- ARCO IRIS EEIEF
