= Crato Formation =

Geologic formation of Early Cretaceous age in northeastern Brazil

- Stratigraphic range: Latest Aptian; ~115–113 Ma
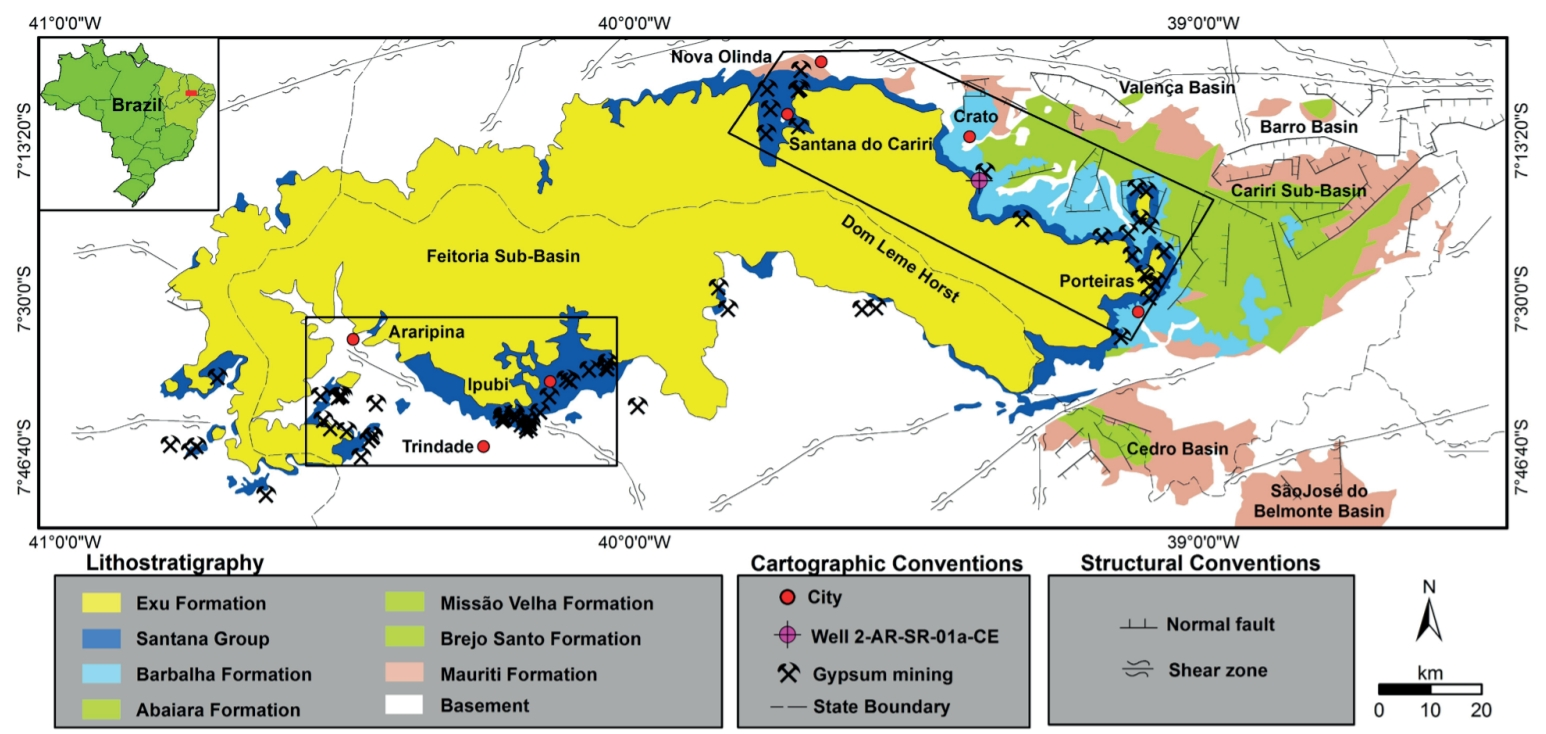
- Extent of the Santana Group, to which the Crato Formation belongs, in blue
- Type: Geological formation
- Unit of: Santana Group
- Sub-units: Nova Olinda Member
- Underlies: Romualdo & Ipubi Formations
- Overlies: Barbalha Formation

Lithology
- Primary: Mudstone, limestone
- Other: Siltstone

Location
- Coordinates: 7.1°S 39.7°W
- Approximate paleocoordinates: 8.6°S 8.0°W
- Region: Ceará, Pernambuco
- Country: Brazil
- Extent: Araripe Basin

Type section
- Named for: Crato, Ceará
- Crato Formation (Brazil)

The Crato Formation is a geologic formation of Early Cretaceous (Aptian) age in northeastern Brazil's Araripe Basin. It is an important Lagerstätte (undisturbed fossil accumulation) for palaeontologists. The strata were laid down mostly during the Aptian age, about 113 million years ago. It thought to have been deposited in a semi-arid lacustrine wetland environment.

The Crato Formation earns the designation of Lagerstätte due to an exceedingly well preserved and diverse fossil faunal assemblage. Some 25 species of fossil fishes are often found with stomach contents preserved, enabling paleontologists to study predator-prey relationships in this ecosystem. There are also fine examples of pterosaurs, reptiles and amphibians, invertebrates (particularly insects), and plants. Even dinosaurs are represented: a new maniraptor was described in 1996. The unusual taphonomy of the site resulted in limestone accretions that formed nodules around dead organisms, preserving even soft parts of their anatomy.

== History ==
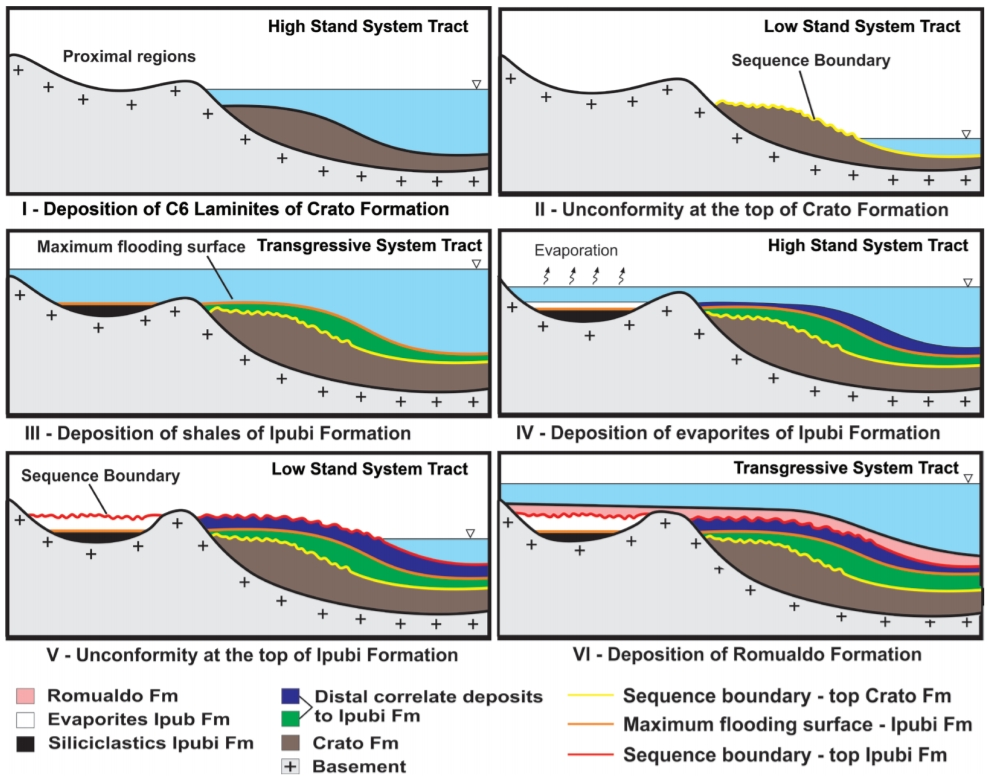
Schematic development of the depositional environments of the Santana Group

Fish fossils in the area were noted in 1823. When they were first methodically published, in 1993, the Crato Formation limestones provided a new site for pterosaurs, one that also preserved insects that fell into a brackish lagoon and semionotid fish preserved in phosphatized nodules. The fossils are usually compacted and preserved in layers of limestone. Fossil Odonata (dragonflies) and damselflies are especially rich in the Crato lagerstätte: currently 384 specimens have been recovered, 264 adults and 120 larvae. Hemiptera (true bugs) and Orthoptera (grasshoppers and crickets) are also abundant in number of species and in number of specimens. There are also plant remains.

Local mining activities for cement and construction damage the sites. Trade in illegally collected fossils has sprung up in the last decade, driven by the remarkable state of preservation and beauty of these fossils and amounting to a considerable local industry. An urgent preservation program is being called for by paleontologists.

In addition, the weathering of Crato and Santana Formation rocks has contributed soil conditions unlike elsewhere in the region. The Araripe manakin (Antilophia bokermanni) is a very rare bird that was discovered only in the late 20th century; it is not known from anywhere outside the characteristic forest that grows on the Chapada do Araripe soils formed ultimately from Crato and Santana Formation rocks.

=== Definition ===
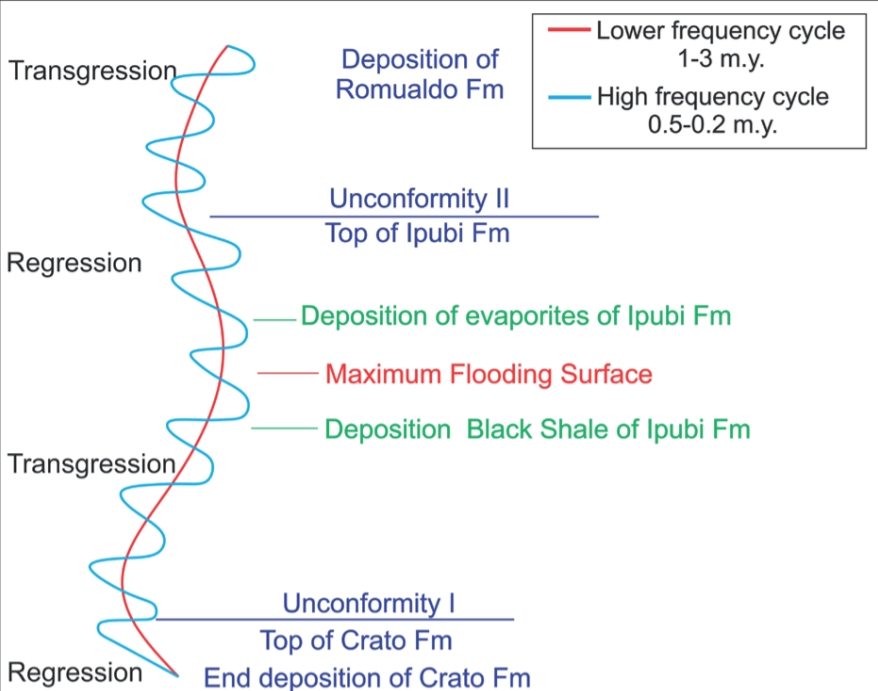
Lake level cyclicity in the Santana Group

The Crato Formation has often historically been considered the lowest member of the Santana Formation (or, alternatively, the Araripina Formation) of the Araripe Group, later redefined as the Romualdo Formation of the Santana Group. The Crato Member is the product of a single phase, where complicated sequence of sediment strata reflect changeable conditions in the opening sea. The age of this strata has been controversial, though most workers have agreed that it lies on or near the Aptian-Albian boundary, about 112 million years ago.

The extent of the Crato unit and its relationship to the Romualdo Formation had long been ill-defined. It was not until a 2007 volume on the unit by Martill, Bechly and Loveridge that the Crato Formation was given a formal type locality, and was formally made a distinct formation separate from the Santana, which is about 10 Ma younger. The Crato Formation is considered time equivalent with the Paracuru Formation.

== Fossil content ==
=== Insects ===
(Note: Many more insects have been described than are present in the table below)

Insects of the Crato Formation
Genus	Species	Presence	Description	Images
Araripenymphes	A. seldoni	Nova Olinda Member	A Cratosmylidae lacewing	
Aestuacrida	A. stereofemoris	Nova Olinda Member	A Locustopsid Grasshopper	
Aestuacrida	A. mikronaulion	Nova Olinda Member	A Locustopsid Grasshopper	
Cratomastax	C. mariellaae	Nova Olinda Member	A Eumastacoid Grasshopper	
Gracilepteryx	G. pulchra		An Eolepidopterigidae moth	
Makarkinia	M. adamsi M. kerneri		A Kalligrammatid lacewing	
Mickoleitia	M. longimanus		A Coxoplectopteran insect	Mickoleitia longimanus
Netoxena	N. nana		An Eolepidopterigidae moth	
Principiala	P. incerta		An Ithonidae lacewing, type species of Principiala	
Psamateia	P. calipsa		An Eolepidopterigidae moth	
Rafaeliana	R. maxima		Neuropterida incertae sedis	
Undopterix	U. cariensis		An Eolepidopterigidae moth	
Astraeoptera	A. vitrea		An Astraeopteridae mayfly.	
Astraeoptera	A. cretacica		An Astraeopteridae mayfly.	
Astraeoptera	A. oligovenata		An Astraeopteridae mayfly.	
Eosophobia	E. acuta		An Astraeopteridae mayfly.	
Vulcanidris	V. cratensis		A hell ant	

=== Arachnids ===
Arachnids of the Crato Formation
Genus	Species	Presence	Description	Images
Mesoproctus	M. rayoli		Whip Scorpion	
Protoischnurus	P. axelrodorum		Scorpion	
Cratosolpuga	C. wunderlichi		Solifuge	
Cretapalpus	C. vittari		Spider	

=== Fish ===
Fish of the Crato Formation
Genus	Species	Presence	Description	Images	Notes
Araripelepidotes	Araripelepidotes temnurus				
Belonostomus	Belonostomus sp.				
Calamopleurus	Calamopleurus cylindricus				
Cladocyclus	Cladocyclus gardneri		An Ichthyodectidae fish		
Cratoamia	Cratoamia gondwanica				
Dastilbe	Dastilbe crandalli				
Lepidotes	Lepidotes wenzae				
Placidichthys	Placidichthys bidorsalis				
Santanichthys	Santanichthys diasii				

=== Amphibians ===
Amphibians of the Crato Formation
Genus	Species	Presence	Description	Images
Arariphrynus	Arariphrynus placidoi			
Cratia	Cratia gracilis			
Cratopipa	Cratopipa novaolindensis			
Eurycephalella	Eurycephalella alcinae			
Kururubatrachus	Kururubatrachus gondwanicus			
Pipoidea	Possible indeterminate pipoid remains.			

=== Squamata ===
Squamates of the Crato Formation
Genus	Species	Presence	Description	Images
Calanguban	C. alamoi		A non-iguana lizard	
Tetrapodophis	T. amplectus		A stem group snake with limbs	
Tijubina	T. pontei		A lizard	
Olindalacerta	O. brasiliensis		A lizard	

=== Dinosaurs ===
Dinosaurs of the Crato Formation
Genus	Species	Presence	Notes	Images
?Avialae	?Avialan species		Numerous isolated feathers	
Cratoavis	C. cearensis		An enantiornithine	
Kaririavis	K. mater		An ornithuromorph	
?Spinosauroidea	?Spinosaur species		Isolated tooth listed in a book appendix. It has later been suggested that the lithostratigraphic provenance of this specimen might have been incorrect.	
"Ubirajara"	"U. jubatus"		An informally-named compsognathid known from a partial skeleton preserving integument	
Sauropoda			Sauropoda footprints.	

=== Crocodylomorphs ===
Crocodylomorphs of the Crato Formation
Genus	Species	Presence	Description	Images
Susisuchus	Susisuchus anatoceps			
Susisuchus	cf. Susisuchus sp.		Undescribed species	

=== Pterosaurs ===
Pterosaurs of the Crato Formation
Genus	Species	Presence	Description	Images
Arthurdactylus	A. conandoylei			
Aymberedactylus	A. cearensis	Nova Olinda Member	A basal member of the Tapejarinae.	Holotype
Brasileodactylus	B. sp.		Likely represents a specimen of Ludodactylus	
Lacusovagus	L. magnificens	Nova Olinda Member		
Ludodactylus	L. sibbicki		An anhanguerid	Ludodactylus sp.
Tupandactylus	T. imperator T. navigans			Tupandactylus navigans
?Tupuxuara	?T. sp.			Tupuxuara sp.
Chaoyangopteridae indet.	Indeterminate	Nova Olinda Member	UFC 721, a series of four articulated cervical vertebrae; may be referrable to Lacusovagus	
Tapejaridae indet.	Indeterminate			
Azhdarchidae indet.	Indeterminate	Nova Olinda Member	SMNK 2342 PAL, a partially articulated, distal portion of a left wing; may be referrable to Lacusovagus	

=== Flora ===
Flora of the Crato Formation
Species	Notes
Araucaria cartellei, Brachyphyllum obesum, B. castilhoi, B. insigne, Iara iguassu, Caytoniales sp., Ephedra sp., Araripia florifera, Araucarites vulcanoi, Cariria orbiculiconiformis, Cearania heterophylla, Cratonia cotyledon, Endressinia brasiliana,Klitzchophyllites flabellatus, Novaolindia dubia, Pluricarpellatia peltata, Podozamites lanceolatus, Protananas lucenae, Ruffordia goeppertii, Tomaxellia biforme, Welwitschiaprisca austroamericana, Welwitschiophyllum brasiliense, Welwitschiostrobus murili, Araucariostrobus sp., Frenelopsis sp., Isoetites sp., Lindleycladus sp., Schizoneura sp.	

=== Fungi ===
Fungi of the Crato Formation
Genus	Species	Presence	Description	Images
Gondwanagaricites	Gondwanagaricites magnificus			
Edaphagaricites	Edaphagaricites conicus			

=== Other fossils ===
- Araripenaeus timidus
- †Cratoalloneura
  - †Cratoalloneura acuminata
  - †Cratoalloneura verdandia
- †Cratoatractocerus
  - †Cratoatractocerus grimaldii
- †Cratoborellia
  - †Cratoborellia gorbi
- †Cratochrysa
  - †Cratochrysa martinsnetoi
  - †Cratochrysa sublapsa
  - †Cratochrysa willmanni
- †Cratocora
  - †Cratocora crassa
- †Cratocordulia
  - †Cratocordulia borschukewitzi
- †Cratocoris
  - †Cratocoris shevchenkoae
- †Cratocorydalopsis
  - †Cratocorydalopsis brasiliensis
- †Cratocossus
  - †Cratocossus magnus
- †Cratodactylus
  - †Cratodactylus ferreirai
  - †Cratodactylus kellneri
- †Cratoelcana
  - †Cratoelcana damianii
  - †Cratoelcana zessini
- †Cratoenigma
  - †Cratoenigma articulata
- †Cratogomphus
  - †Cratogomphus erraticus
- †Cratogryllus
  - †Cratogryllus cigueli
  - †Cratogryllus guimaraesae
  - †Cratogryllus pentagonalis
- †Cratohagenius
  - †Cratohagenius erichweberi
- †Cratohaglopsis
  - †Cratohaglopsis santanaensis
- †Cratohexagenites
  - †Cratohexagenites longicercus
  - †Cratohexagenites minor
- †Cratokalotermes
  - †Cratokalotermes santanensis
- †Cratolindenia
  - †Cratolindenia knuepfae
- †Cratolocustopsis
  - †Cratolocustopsis araripensis
  - †Cratolocustopsis contumax' – type locality for species
  - †Cratolocustopsis cretacea
- †Cratomacer
  - †Cratomacer ephippiger
  - †Cratomacer immersus
- †Cratomastotermes
  - †Cratomastotermes wolfschwenningeri
- †Cratomyia
  - †Cratomyia cretacica
  - †Cratomyia macrorrhyncha
- †Cratonemonyx
  - †Cratonemonyx martinsnetoi
- †Cratonemopteryx
  - †Cratonemopteryx audax
  - †Cratonemopteryx robusta
  - †Cratonemopteryx speciosa
- †Cratonepa
  - †Cratonepa enigmatica
- †Cratonerthra
  - †Cratonerthra corinthiana
  - †Cratonerthra estevezae
- †Cratoneura
  - †Cratoneura dividens
  - †Cratoneura longissima
  - †Cratoneura pulchella
- †Cratonympha
  - †Cratonympha microcelata
- †Cratopelocoris
  - †Cratopelocoris carpinteroi
- †Cratopetalia
  - †Cratopetalia whiteheadi
- †Cratopetalura
  - †Cratopetalura petruleviciusi
  - †Cratopetalura petruleviciusi
- †Cratopsychopsis
  - †Cratopsychopsis maiseyi
- †Cratopteryx
  - †Cratopteryx nemopteroides
  - †Cratopteryx robertosantosi
- †Cratoraricrus
  - †Cratoraricrus oberlii
- †Cratoscalapha
  - †Cratoscalapha electroneura
- †Cratosirex
  - †Cratosirex sennlaubi
- †Cratosisyrops
  - †Cratosisyrops gonzagai
- †Cratosmylus
  - †Cratosmylus magnificus
- †Cratostenophlebia
  - †Cratostenophlebia schwickerti
- †Cratotabanus
  - †Cratotabanus stonemyomorphus
- †Cratotetraspinus
  - †Cratotetraspinus fossorius
- †Cratotipula
  - †Cratotipula latialata
- †Cratovitisma
  - †Cratovitisma oldreadi
- †Cratovoluptia
  - †Cratovoluptia criptoneura
- †Cratozeunerella
  - †Cratozeunerella amedegnatoi
  - †Cratozeunerella godoii
  - †Cratozeunerella neotropica
  - †Cratozeunerella nervosa
  - †Cratozeunerella soaresi
  - †Cratozeunerella titanella

== See also ==
- Araripe Basin
- Botucatu Formation
- Elrhaz Formation
- Itapecuru Formation
- Quiricó Formation
