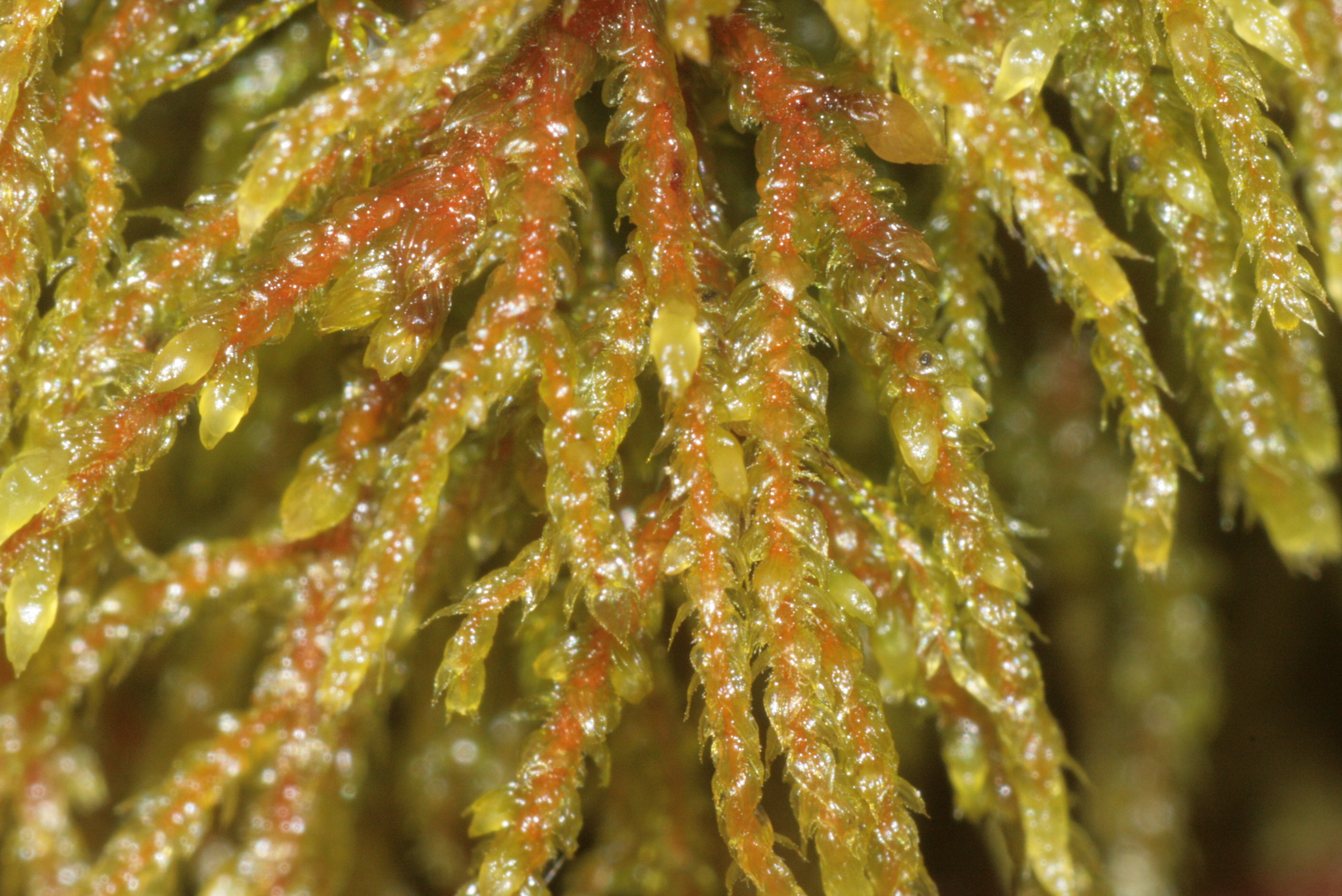

Scientific classification
- Kingdom: Plantae
- Division: Bryophyta
- Class: Bryopsida
- Subclass: Bryidae
- Order: Hypnales
- Family: Hylocomiaceae
- Genus: Hylocomium
- Species: H. umbratum

Binomial name
- Hylocomium umbratum (Ehrh. ex Hedw.) M. Fleisch.

= Hylocomium umbratum =

Species of moss

Hylocomium umbratum is a species of moss belonging to the family Hylocomiaceae.

It is native to Europe and Northern America.
