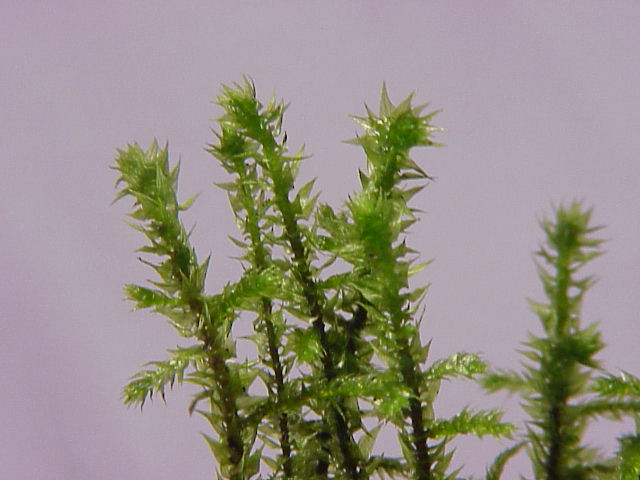
- Rhytidiadelphus triquetrus

Scientific classification
- Kingdom: Plantae
- Division: Bryophyta
- Class: Bryopsida
- Subclass: Bryidae
- Order: Hypnales
- Family: Hylocomiaceae
- Genus: Rhytidiadelphus
- Species: R. triquetrus

Binomial name
- Rhytidiadelphus triquetrus (Hedw.) Warnst.

Synonyms
- Hylocomiadelphus triquetrus (Hedw.) Ochyra & Stebel; Hypnum triquetrum Hedw.

= Rhytidiadelphus triquetrus =

Rough goose neck moss

Species of moss

Rhytidiadelphus triquetrus, the big shaggy-moss or rough goose neck moss, is a species of moss in the family Hylocomiaceae. It is often the dominating moss species in moderately rich forest habitats in the boreal regions and the Pacific Northwest. Because of its fuzzy appearance and tail-like shape it is also called the 'electrified cat's tail moss'. Not to be confused with square goose-necked moss, Rhytidiadelphus squarrosus.

== Ecology ==
Terrestrial on humus-rich substrates in montane forests. Occasionally grows on logs and trees in lowland rainforests or on sandy-gravelly soils near streams.

== Response to herbicide application ==
In a study of the effect of the herbicide Asulam on moss growth, Rhytidiadelphus triquetrus was shown to have intermediate sensitivity to Asulam exposure.
