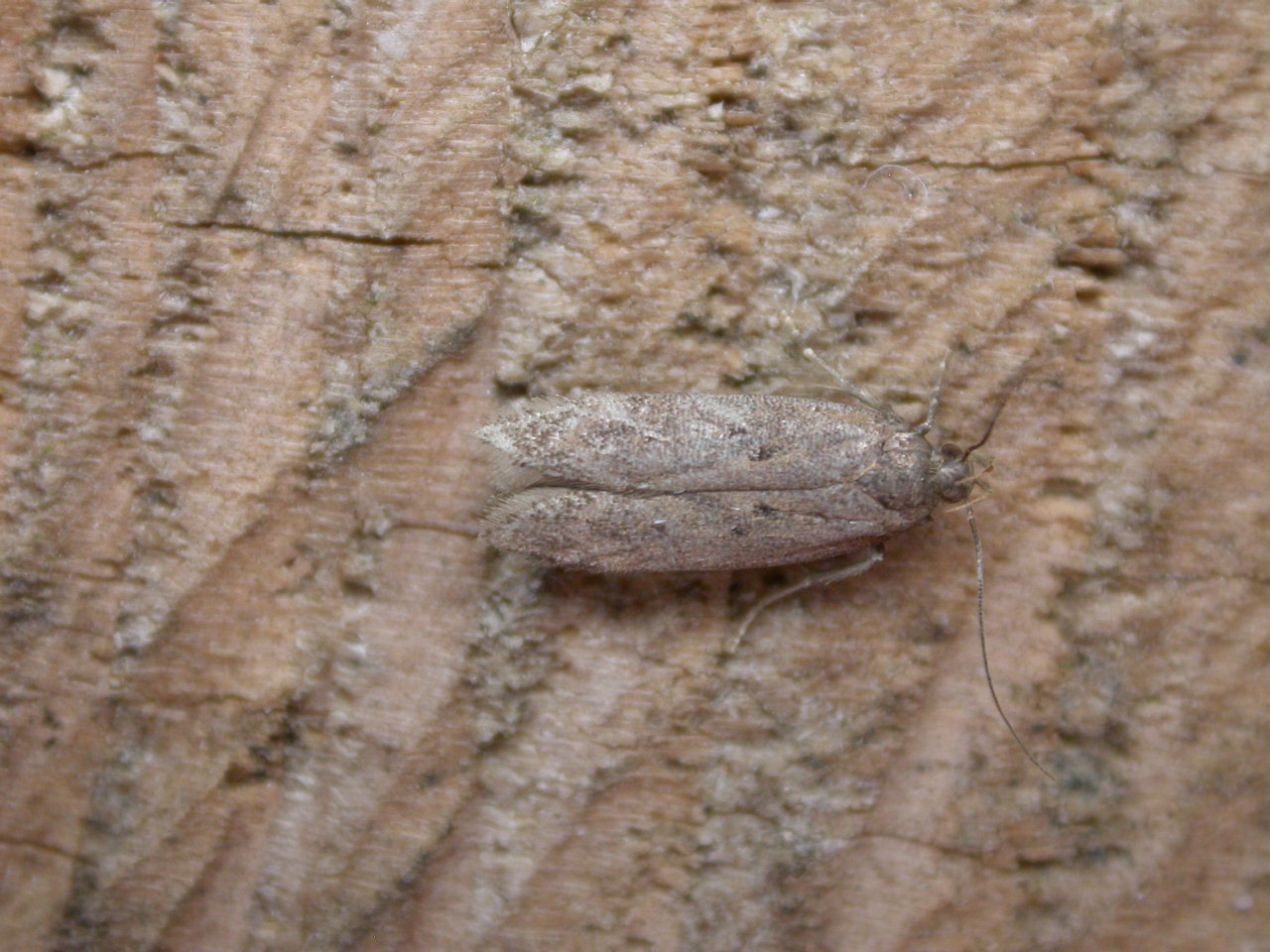

Scientific classification
- Domain: Eukaryota
- Kingdom: Animalia
- Phylum: Arthropoda
- Class: Insecta
- Order: Lepidoptera
- Family: Gelechiidae
- Genus: Bryotropha
- Species: B. terrella

Binomial name
- Bryotropha terrella (Denis & Schiffermüller, 1775)

Synonyms
- Tinea terrella Denis & Schiffermüller, 1775; Tinea inulella Hübner, [1805]; Nothris pauperella Hübner, [1825]; Gelechia latella Herrich-Schäffer, 1854; Gelechia lutescens Constant, 1865; Gelechia suspectella Heinemann, 1870; Bryotropha alpicolella Heinemann, 1870; Gelechia distinctella var. tenebrosella Teich, 1886; Bryotropha terrella var. sardoterrella Schawerda, 1936; Bryotropha terrella ab. quignoni Dufrane, 1938; Bryotropha terrella ab. joannisi Dufrane, 1938; Bryotropha terrella ab. rufa Dufrane, 1938; Bryotropha terrella ab. ochrea Dufrane, 1938

= Bryotropha terrella =

Species of moth

Bryotropha terrella is a moth of the family Gelechiidae. It is the type species of the genus Bryotropha. It is found in Europe.

The wingspan is 14–16 mm. Forewings very variable in ground colour - dark fuscous, shades of brown and grey to cream (coastal form), dark shining bronzy base of costa purplish-tinged. Variously showing the ‘bryotropha’ spots, a sub-terminal fascia and spots around the wing tip or unicolorous. Hindwings grey. Certain identification is by miscroscopic examination of the genitalia.

The moths are on wing from May to August depending on the location.

The larvae feed on various mosses and grasses, including Rhytidiadelphus squarrosus, Syntrichia ruraliformis, Hypnum jutlandicum, Calliergonella cuspidata and Agrostis capillaris.
