= Ptilium =

Ptilium may refer to:

- Ptilium (beetle), an insect genus in the subfamily Ptiliinae
- Ptilium (plant), a moss genus in the family Hypnaceae
- Ptilium, a genus of Hymenoptera in the unknown family, described in 1827 by Berthold
