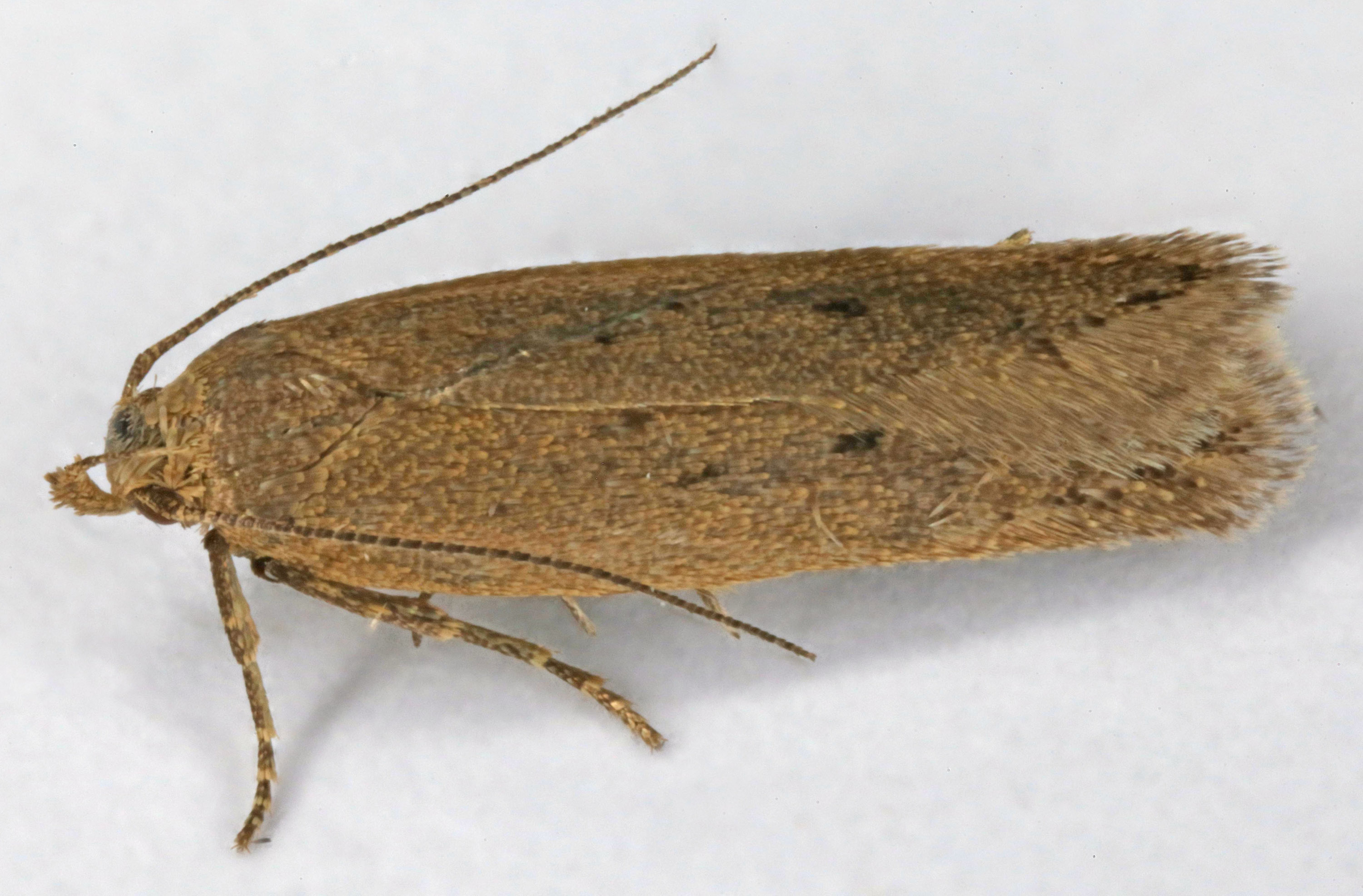

Scientific classification
- Kingdom: Animalia
- Phylum: Arthropoda
- Clade: Pancrustacea
- Class: Insecta
- Order: Lepidoptera
- Family: Gelechiidae
- Genus: Bryotropha
- Species: B. politella

Binomial name
- Bryotropha politella (Stainton, 1851)

Synonyms
- Gelechia politella Stainton, 1851; Gelechia expolitella Doubleday, 1859

= Bryotropha politella =

Species of moth

Bryotropha politella is a moth of the family Gelechiidae. It is found in Ireland, England, Scotland and the Massif Central in France.

== Description ==
The wingspan is 12–16 mm for males and 13–15 mm for females. The terminal joint of palpi is longer than second. The forewings are light brownish-ochreous or brownish; stigmata in male dark fuscous, indistinct, in female black, distinct, first discal beyond plical; sometimes some terminal black dots. Hindwings pale grey.

== Biology ==
Adults have been recorded on wing from late May to late July.

The larvae feed on Rhytidiadelphus squarrosus.
