= Scythris laminella =

Scientific classification
- Kingdom: Animalia
- Phylum: Arthropoda
- Class: Insecta
- Order: Lepidoptera
- Family: Scythrididae
- Genus: Scythris
- Species: S. laminella

Binomial name
- Scythris laminella (Denis & Schiffermüller, 1775)

Synonyms
- Tinea laminella Denis & Schiffermüller, 1775; Butalis succisae Rössler, 1866; Butalis schuetzei Fuchs, 1901; Butalis disqueella Fuchs, 1903; Lita aereella Duponchel, 1842

Species of moth

Scythris laminella is a moth of the family Scythrididae. It was described by Michael Denis and Ignaz Schiffermüller in 1775. It is found in most of Europe (except Ireland, Great Britain, the Iberian Peninsula, Slovenia and Ukraine) and Central Asia.

The wingspan is 9–11 mm. Adults are on wing from May to July.

The larvae feed on Rhytidiadelphus squarrosus and Hieracium pilosella.
