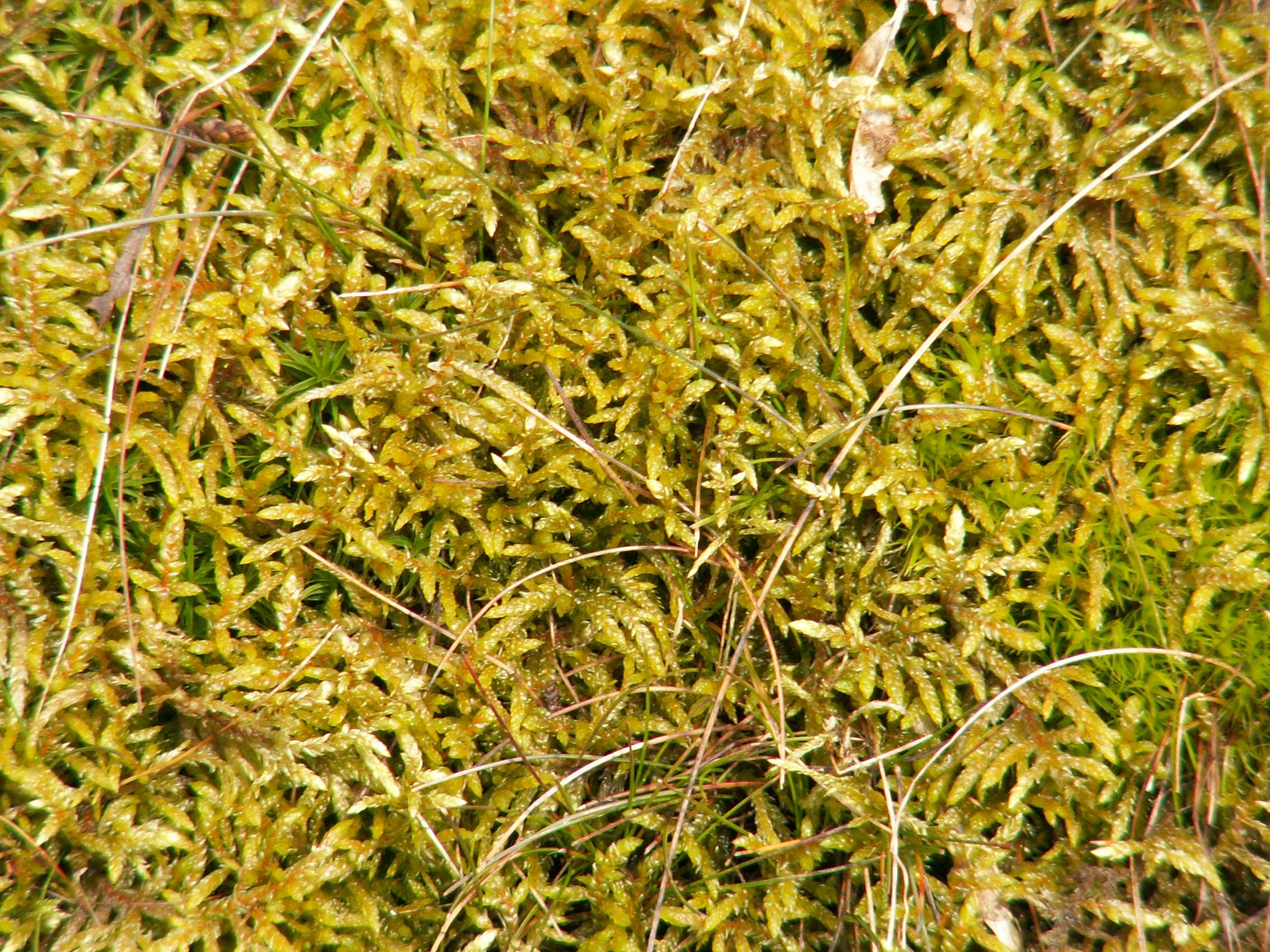

Scientific classification
- Kingdom: Plantae
- Clade: Embryophytes
- Division: Bryophyta
- Class: Bryopsida
- Subclass: Bryidae
- Order: Hypnales
- Family: Hylocomiaceae
- Genus: Pleurozium
- Species: P. schreberi

Binomial name
- Pleurozium schreberi (Brid.) Mitt.

= Pleurozium schreberi =

Species of moss

Pleurozium schreberi, the red-stemmed feathermoss or Schreber's big red stem moss, is a moss with a loose growth pattern. The prefix 'pleuro-' is derived from the Latin word for ribs, possibly referring to the way the branches extend from the stem.

The species is commonly found on the floor of the boreal forests of Canada, Scandinavia, and northern Russia. It is a characteristic component of black spruce/feathermoss climax forest, which sometimes have a moderately dense overstory canopy and a forest floor dominated by feathermosses such as Hylocomium splendens and Ptilium crista-castrensis.

In a study of the effect of the herbicide Asulam on moss growth found that Pleurozium schreberi exhibited intermediate sensitivity to exposure.

== Gallery ==
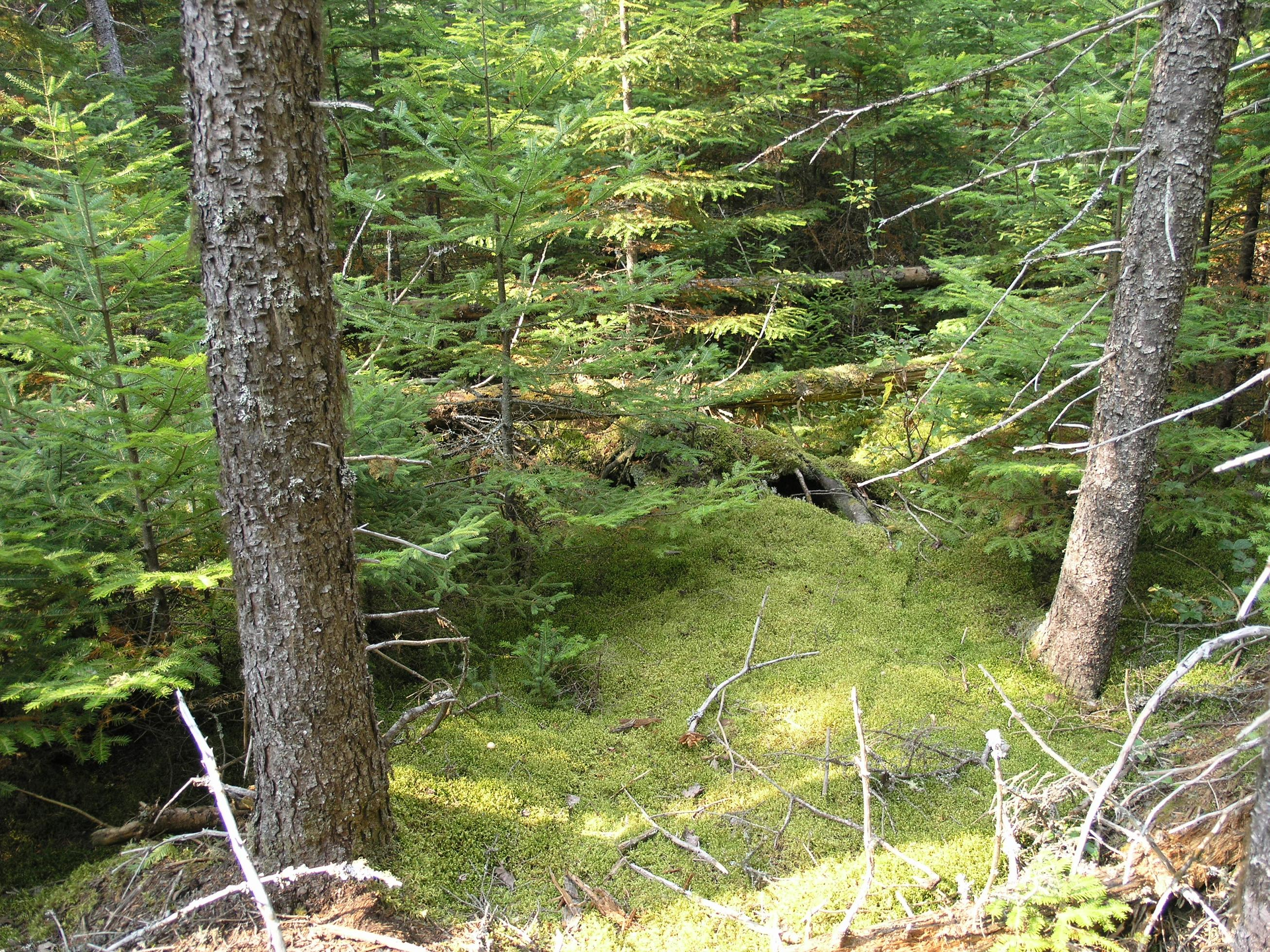
Pleurozium schreberi carpeting the floor of black spruce (Picea mariana) and balsam fir (Abies balsamea) forest in New Brunswick, Canada
