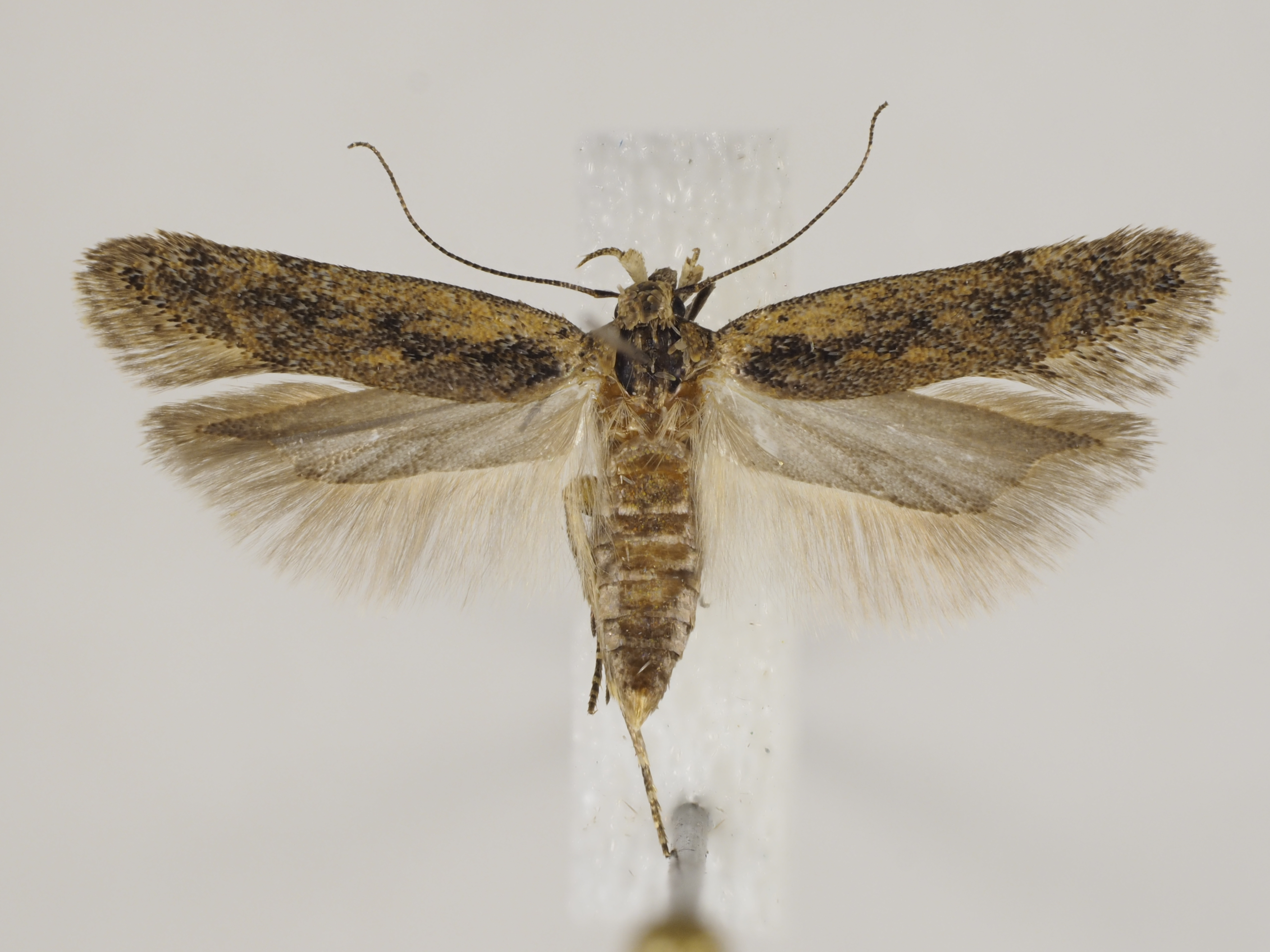

Scientific classification
- Domain: Eukaryota
- Kingdom: Animalia
- Phylum: Arthropoda
- Class: Insecta
- Order: Lepidoptera
- Family: Gelechiidae
- Genus: Bryotropha
- Species: B. desertella

Binomial name
- Bryotropha desertella (Douglas, 1850)

Synonyms
- Gelechia desertella Douglas, 1850; Gelechia decrepidella Herrich-Schäffer, 1854; Bryotropha glabrella Heinemann, 1870

= Bryotropha desertella =

Species of moth

Bryotropha desertella is a moth of the family Gelechiidae. It is found in most of Europe, North Africa (Morocco), Turkey, Turkmenistan and the Russian Far East.

The wingspan is 11–16 mm. The terminal joint of palpi longer than second. Forewings light brownish-ochreous, often brownish -sprinkled; a blackish discal dot towards base; stigmata black, first discal beyond plical; sometimes some terminal blackish dots. Hindwings pale grey.

Adults have been recorded on wing from early April to late September. In the north, there probably is one generation per year. In the south, there are two generations per year.

The larvae feed on mosses such as Syntrichia ruraliformis, Homalothecium lutescens and Rhytidiadelphus squarrosus.
