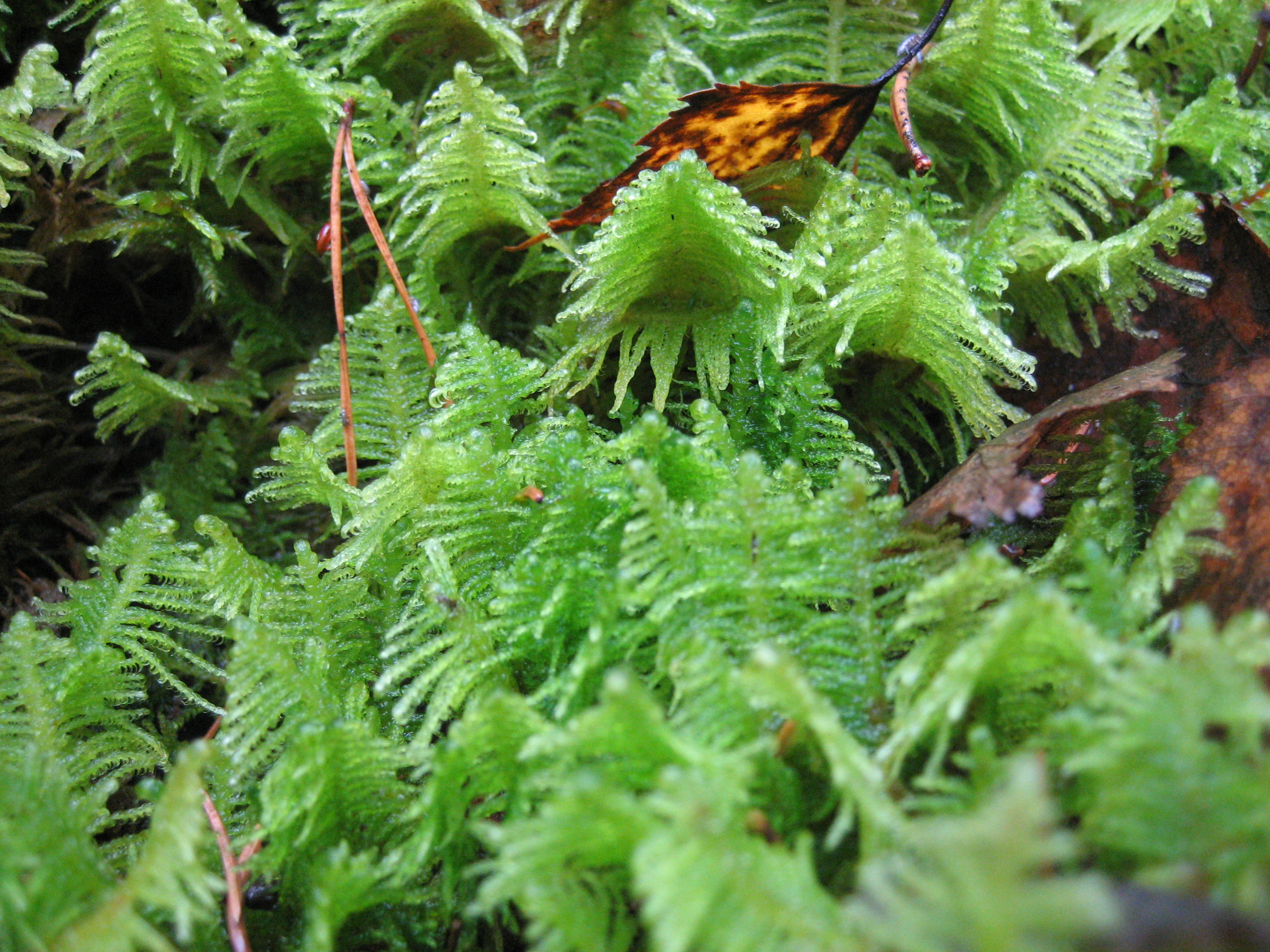
- Ptilium crista-castrensis

Scientific classification
- Kingdom: Plantae
- Division: Bryophyta
- Class: Bryopsida
- Subclass: Bryidae
- Order: Hypnales
- Family: Pylaisiaceae
- Genus: Ptilium

Species
- See text

= Ptilium (plant) =

Genus of mosses

Ptilium is a genus of mosses with very broad worldwide occurrence. This genus is within the family Hypnaceae, in the class Bryopsida, subclass Bryidae and order Hypnales.

== Ecology ==
Some of these species occur on the floor of Canadian boreal forests; an example of this occurrence is within the black spruce/feathermoss climax forest, often having moderately dense canopy and featuring a forest floor of feathermosses including, according to Hogan, Hylocomium splendens, Pleurozium schreberi and Ptilium crista-castrensis.

== See also ==
- Feather moss
