= Bryotropha hulli =

Scientific classification
- Kingdom: Animalia
- Phylum: Arthropoda
- Clade: Pancrustacea
- Class: Insecta
- Order: Lepidoptera
- Family: Gelechiidae
- Genus: Bryotropha
- Species: B. hulli

Binomial name
- Bryotropha hulli Karsholt & Rutten, 2005

Species of moth

Bryotropha hulli is a species of moth in the family Gelechiidae. It is native to the eastern Mediterranean, from the Balkans west to Anatolia and West Asia. It is found in Israel, Syria, Turkey, Cyprus, Greece (including the Aegean Islands and Crete), Bulgaria, North Macedonia, and Croatia. It is a small moth with a wingspan of 9–11 mm and can be easily distinguished from other moths by its small size, dark brown forewings, and pale hindwings. Adults can be seen from late April to early November.

== Taxonomy ==
The species is named after M. Hull, a collector who lent many specimens of Bryotropha species to the authors who described this species, including many specimens of B. hulli.

== Description ==
Bryotropha hulli is a small moth with a wingspan of 9–11 mm. It has a dark brown forewing and pale hindwing. The labial palpus is cream to ochreous and is marked with dark brownish-grey. The antennae have ochreous rings and the frons is also ochreous. The forewing is dark brown to dark greyish brown, with heavy ochreous flecking, and frequently has a pale spot near the base. The vertex, thorax and tegulae are the same color as the forewing. There are noticeable black markings on the costa and tornus. The costal and tornal patches are vague and merge into the indistinct, slightly bent fascia. The plical and discal stigmata are faint and the first discal is marginally beyond the second plical stigmata. The forewing cilia are greyish-brown with yellow tips and have one dark ciliary line. The hindwing is brown, pale at the base and much darker towards the tip. The hindwing cilia are the same color as the hindwing. Individuals of the species can vary in color from dark ochreous grey to orange-brown, dark brown, and fuscous. The wing markings are also variably noticeable.

Bryotropha hulli can be easily distinguished from other moths by its small size, dark brown forewings, and pale hindwings. It resembles a miniature B. pallorella, but that species only occurs in the western Mediterranean. It is also similar to B. affinis, B. senectella, and B. dryadella, but those species have distinctive light patches after their discal and plical stigmata, which are absent in the present species.

== Distribution and ecology ==
Bryotropha hulli is found widely throughout the eastern Mediterranean, from the Balkans to Anatolia and West Asia. It is found in Israel, Syria, Turkey, Cyprus, Greece (including the Aegean Islands and Crete), Bulgaria, North Macedonia, and Croatia. In most of its range it can be found to altitudes of up to 1400 m, but it can occur as high as 2100 m in central Turkey. Adults can be seen from late April to early November.
