= Bryotropha svenssoni =

Scientific classification
- Kingdom: Animalia
- Phylum: Arthropoda
- Class: Insecta
- Order: Lepidoptera
- Family: Gelechiidae
- Genus: Bryotropha
- Species: B. svenssoni

Binomial name
- Bryotropha svenssoni Park, 1984

Synonyms
- Bryotropha ambisenectella Li & Zheng, 1997

Species of moth

Bryotropha svenssoni is a moth of the family Gelechiidae. It is found in central China and eastern Asia, including Japan.

The wingspan is 12–13 mm.
