= Bryotropha parapurpurella =

Scientific classification
- Kingdom: Animalia
- Phylum: Arthropoda
- Class: Insecta
- Order: Lepidoptera
- Family: Gelechiidae
- Genus: Bryotropha
- Species: B. parapurpurella

Binomial name
- Bryotropha parapurpurella Bidzilya, 1998

Species of moth

Bryotropha parapurpurella is a moth of the family Gelechiidae. It is found in Russia (Siberia: Transbaikalia).
