= Bryotropha phycitiniphila =

Scientific classification
- Kingdom: Animalia
- Phylum: Arthropoda
- Clade: Pancrustacea
- Class: Insecta
- Order: Lepidoptera
- Family: Gelechiidae
- Genus: Bryotropha
- Species: B. phycitiniphila

Binomial name
- Bryotropha phycitiniphila Karsholt & Rutten, 2005

Species of moth

Bryotropha phycitiniphila is a moth of the family Gelechiidae. It is found in south-eastern Kazakhstan.

The wingspan is 13–14 mm for males and about 12 mm for females. Adults have been recorded on wing from June to July.
