= Bryotropha wolschrijni =

Scientific classification
- Kingdom: Animalia
- Phylum: Arthropoda
- Clade: Pancrustacea
- Class: Insecta
- Order: Lepidoptera
- Family: Gelechiidae
- Genus: Bryotropha
- Species: B. wolschrijni

Binomial name
- Bryotropha wolschrijni Karsholt & Rutten, 2005

Species of moth

Bryotropha wolschrijni is a moth of the family Gelechiidae. It is found in mountainous areas of Spain and Morocco.

The wingspan is 14–15 mm. Adults have been recorded on wing from June to July and in late September.
