= Bryotropha arabica =

Scientific classification
- Kingdom: Animalia
- Phylum: Arthropoda
- Class: Insecta
- Order: Lepidoptera
- Family: Gelechiidae
- Genus: Bryotropha
- Species: B. arabica

Binomial name
- Bryotropha arabica Amsel, 1952

Species of moth

Bryotropha arabica is a moth of the family Gelechiidae. It is found in Spain, France, Bulgaria, North Macedonia and Greece, as well as on Crete, Cyprus and Sicily. Outside of Europe, it is found in Turkey, North Africa (Morocco, Algeria, Tunisia, Libya), the Middle East (Israel, Lebanon, Syria), Saudi Arabia, Yemen, Iraq, Iran and Turkmenistan.

The wingspan is 12–17 mm.
