= Hylocomiastrum =

Scientific classification
- Kingdom: Plantae
- Division: Bryophyta
- Class: Bryopsida
- Subclass: Bryidae
- Order: Hypnales
- Family: Hylocomiaceae
- Genus: Hylocomiastrum; M.Fleisch. ex Broth.

Genus of mosses

Hylocomiastrum is a genus of mosses belonging to the family Hylocomiaceae.

Species:

- Hylocomiastrum himalayanum (Mitt.) Broth.
- Hylocomiastrum pyrenaicum (Spruce) M. Fleisch.
- Hylocomiastrum umbratum (Ehrh. ex Hedw.) M. Fleisch.
