= Bryotropha palliptera =

Scientific classification
- Kingdom: Animalia
- Phylum: Arthropoda
- Class: Insecta
- Order: Lepidoptera
- Family: Gelechiidae
- Genus: Bryotropha
- Species: B. palliptera

Binomial name
- Bryotropha palliptera Li & Wang, 2000

Species of moth

Bryotropha palliptera is a moth of the family Gelechiidae. It is found in Henan, China.
