= Bryotropha vondermuhlli =

Scientific classification
- Kingdom: Animalia
- Phylum: Arthropoda
- Class: Insecta
- Order: Lepidoptera
- Family: Gelechiidae
- Genus: Bryotropha
- Species: B. vondermuhlli

Binomial name
- Bryotropha vondermuhlli Nel & Brusseaux, 2003

Species of moth

Bryotropha vondermuhlli is a moth of the family Gelechiidae. It is found in Portugal, Spain and France.

The wingspan is 11–13 mm. Adults have been recorded on wing from June to September.
