= Bryotropha dryadella =

Scientific classification
- Kingdom: Animalia
- Phylum: Arthropoda
- Clade: Pancrustacea
- Class: Insecta
- Order: Lepidoptera
- Family: Gelechiidae
- Genus: Bryotropha
- Species: B. dryadella

Binomial name
- Bryotropha dryadella (Zeller, 1850)

Synonyms
- Gelechia dryadella Zeller, 1850; Bryotropha saralella Amsel, 1952

Species of moth

Bryotropha dryadella is a moth of the family Gelechiidae. It is found in Great Britain, France, Portugal, Spain, Corsica, Sardinia, Sicily, Italy, Albania, North Macedonia, Bulgaria, Greece, Crete and Algeria.

The wingspan is 10–12 mm. Adults have been recorded on wing from May to September, in southern Europe probably in two generations per year.
