= Bryotropha branella =

Scientific classification
- Kingdom: Animalia
- Phylum: Arthropoda
- Class: Insecta
- Order: Lepidoptera
- Family: Gelechiidae
- Genus: Bryotropha
- Species: B. branella

Binomial name
- Bryotropha branella (Busck, 1908)

Synonyms
- Gelechia branella Busck, 1908

Species of moth

Bryotropha branella is a moth of the family Gelechiidae. It is found in the north-eastern part of the United States and adjoining south-eastern Canada.

The wingspan is 11–13 mm. Adults have been recorded on wing from late June to mid August and in mid-September. There is probably one generation per year.
