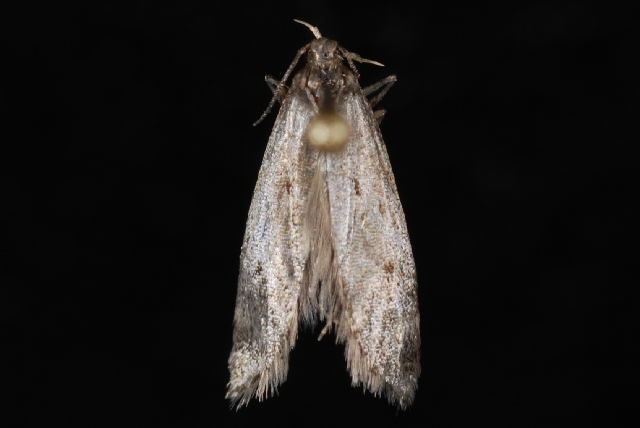

Scientific classification
- Kingdom: Animalia
- Phylum: Arthropoda
- Clade: Pancrustacea
- Class: Insecta
- Order: Lepidoptera
- Family: Gelechiidae
- Genus: Bryotropha
- Species: B. gemella

Binomial name
- Bryotropha gemella Rutten & Karsholt, 2004

= Bryotropha gemella =

Species of moth

Bryotropha gemella is a moth of the family Gelechiidae. It is found in the north-eastern part of the United States and the adjoining south-eastern part of Canada.

The wingspan is 15–16 millimetres (0.59–0.63 in) for males and 13–14 millimetres (0.51–0.55 in) for females.
