= Bryotropha azovica =

Scientific classification
- Kingdom: Animalia
- Phylum: Arthropoda
- Class: Insecta
- Order: Lepidoptera
- Family: Gelechiidae
- Genus: Bryotropha
- Species: B. azovica

Binomial name
- Bryotropha azovica Bidzilia, 1997

Species of moth

Bryotropha azovica is a moth of the family Gelechiidae. It is found in Bulgaria, Greece, North Macedonia, Cyprus, Turkey and Ukraine.

The wingspan is 11–14 mm. Adults have been recorded on wing from May to July and again from late September to early October.
