= Bryotropha purpurella =

Scientific classification
- Kingdom: Animalia
- Phylum: Arthropoda
- Class: Insecta
- Order: Lepidoptera
- Family: Gelechiidae
- Genus: Bryotropha
- Species: B. purpurella

Binomial name
- Bryotropha purpurella (Zetterstedt, 1839)

Synonyms
- Lita purpurella Zetterstedt, 1839; Gelechia flavipalpella Nylander in Tengström, 1848

Species of moth

Bryotropha purpurella is a moth of the family Gelechiidae. It is found in Norway, Sweden, Finland, Latvia and Russia (European part of Russia, Transbaikalia and Altai).

The wingspan is 10–12 mm. Adults have been recorded on wing from June to July.
