= Bryotropha aliterrella =

Scientific classification
- Kingdom: Animalia
- Phylum: Arthropoda
- Class: Insecta
- Order: Lepidoptera
- Family: Gelechiidae
- Genus: Bryotropha
- Species: B. aliterrella

Binomial name
- Bryotropha aliterrella (Rebel, 1935)

Synonyms
- Gelechia aliterrella Rebel, 1935

Species of moth

Bryotropha aliterrella is a moth of the family Gelechiidae. It is found in Spain.

The wingspan is 14–15 mm. Adults have been recorded on wing in July.
