= Bryotropha plebejella =

Scientific classification
- Kingdom: Animalia
- Phylum: Arthropoda
- Clade: Pancrustacea
- Class: Insecta
- Order: Lepidoptera
- Family: Gelechiidae
- Genus: Bryotropha
- Species: B. plebejella

Binomial name
- Bryotropha plebejella (Zeller, 1847)

Synonyms
- Gelechia plebejella Zeller, 1847; Gelechia imperitella Staudinger, 1859; Aristotelia ancillula Walsingham, 1908; Bryotropha inexpectella Nel, 1999

Species of moth

Bryotropha plebejella is a moth of the family Gelechiidae. It is found in Portugal, Spain, southern France, Corsica, Sardinia, Sicily, Croatia, North Macedonia, Greece, the Aegean Islands, Crete, Cyprus, Turkey, Syria, Israel, Algeria, Tunisia, Libya, Madeira and the Canary Islands.

The wingspan is 10–13 mm. Adults have been recorded on wing from April to late September, probably in two generations per year.
