= Bryotropha pallorella =

Scientific classification
- Kingdom: Animalia
- Phylum: Arthropoda
- Class: Insecta
- Order: Lepidoptera
- Family: Gelechiidae
- Genus: Bryotropha
- Species: B. pallorella

Binomial name
- Bryotropha pallorella Amsel, 1952

Synonyms
- Bryotropha mulinoides Amsel, 1952; Bryotropha zannonicola Hartig, 1953

Species of moth

Bryotropha pallorella is a moth of the family Gelechiidae. It is found in Portugal, Spain, France, Corsica, Sardinia, Italy and Morocco.

The wingspan is 11–13 mm. Adults have been recorded on wing from March to October.
