= Bryotropha sutteri =

Scientific classification
- Kingdom: Animalia
- Phylum: Arthropoda
- Clade: Pancrustacea
- Class: Insecta
- Order: Lepidoptera
- Family: Gelechiidae
- Genus: Bryotropha
- Species: B. sutteri

Binomial name
- Bryotropha sutteri Karsholt & Rutten, 2005

Species of moth

Bryotropha sutteri is a moth of the family Gelechiidae. It is found in Spain, Tunisia, Sardinia, Sicily, Lesbos and Turkey.

The wingspan is 13–14 mm. Adults have been recorded on wing from May to June and from August to September.

== Etymology ==
The species is named in honour of Mr. R. Sutter who did a lot of work on Microlepidoptera.
