= Bryotropha italica =

Scientific classification
- Kingdom: Animalia
- Phylum: Arthropoda
- Clade: Pancrustacea
- Class: Insecta
- Order: Lepidoptera
- Family: Gelechiidae
- Genus: Bryotropha
- Species: B. italica

Binomial name
- Bryotropha italica Karsholt & Rutten, 2005

Species of moth

Bryotropha italica is a moth of the family Gelechiidae. It is found in Italy.

The wingspan is 13–14 mm. Adults have been recorded on wing from late May to mid-July.

The larvae possibly feed on Melandrium album.

== Etymology ==
This species name refers to Italy, the country from which it was first described.
