= Bryotropha sattleri =

Scientific classification
- Kingdom: Animalia
- Phylum: Arthropoda
- Class: Insecta
- Order: Lepidoptera
- Family: Gelechiidae
- Genus: Bryotropha
- Species: B. sattleri

Binomial name
- Bryotropha sattleri Nel, 2003

Species of moth

Bryotropha sattleri is a moth of the family Gelechiidae. It is found in Portugal, Spain, France, Sardinia, Italy, Greece, the Aegean Islands, Crete and Morocco.

The wingspan is 14–16 mm. Adults have been recorded on wing from April to October.
