= Rhytidium =

Scientific classification
- Kingdom: Plantae
- Clade: Embryophytes
- Division: Bryophyta
- Class: Bryopsida
- Subclass: Bryidae
- Order: Hypnales
- Family: Hylocomiaceae
- Genus: Rhytidium (Sull.) Kindb.

Genus of mosses

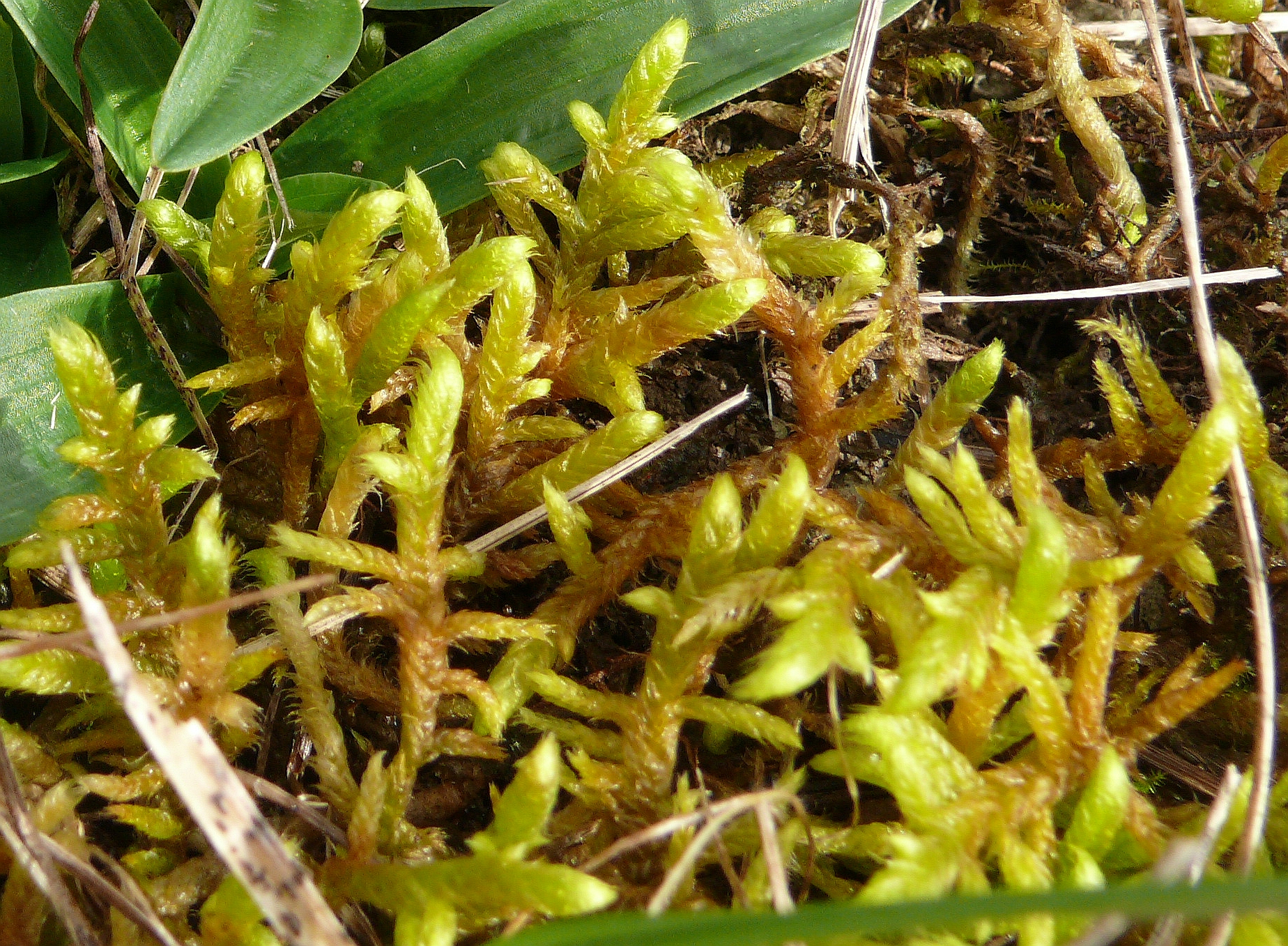
Rhytidium rugosum, Hohenlohe, Germany

Rhytidium is a genus of mosses belonging to the family Hylocomiaceae.

The genus has almost cosmopolitan distribution.

Species:

- Rhytidium rugosum Kindberg, 1883
