= Bryotropha sabulosella =

Scientific classification
- Kingdom: Animalia
- Phylum: Arthropoda
- Class: Insecta
- Order: Lepidoptera
- Family: Gelechiidae
- Genus: Bryotropha
- Species: B. sabulosella

Binomial name
- Bryotropha sabulosella (Rebel, 1905)

Synonyms
- Lita sabulosella Rebel, 1905

Species of moth

Bryotropha sabulosella is a moth of the family Gelechiidae. It is found in North Macedonia, Greece, Cyprus, Turkey and northern Iran.

The wingspan is 11–13 mm. Adults have been recorded on wing from June to July and from September to October, probably in two generations per year.
