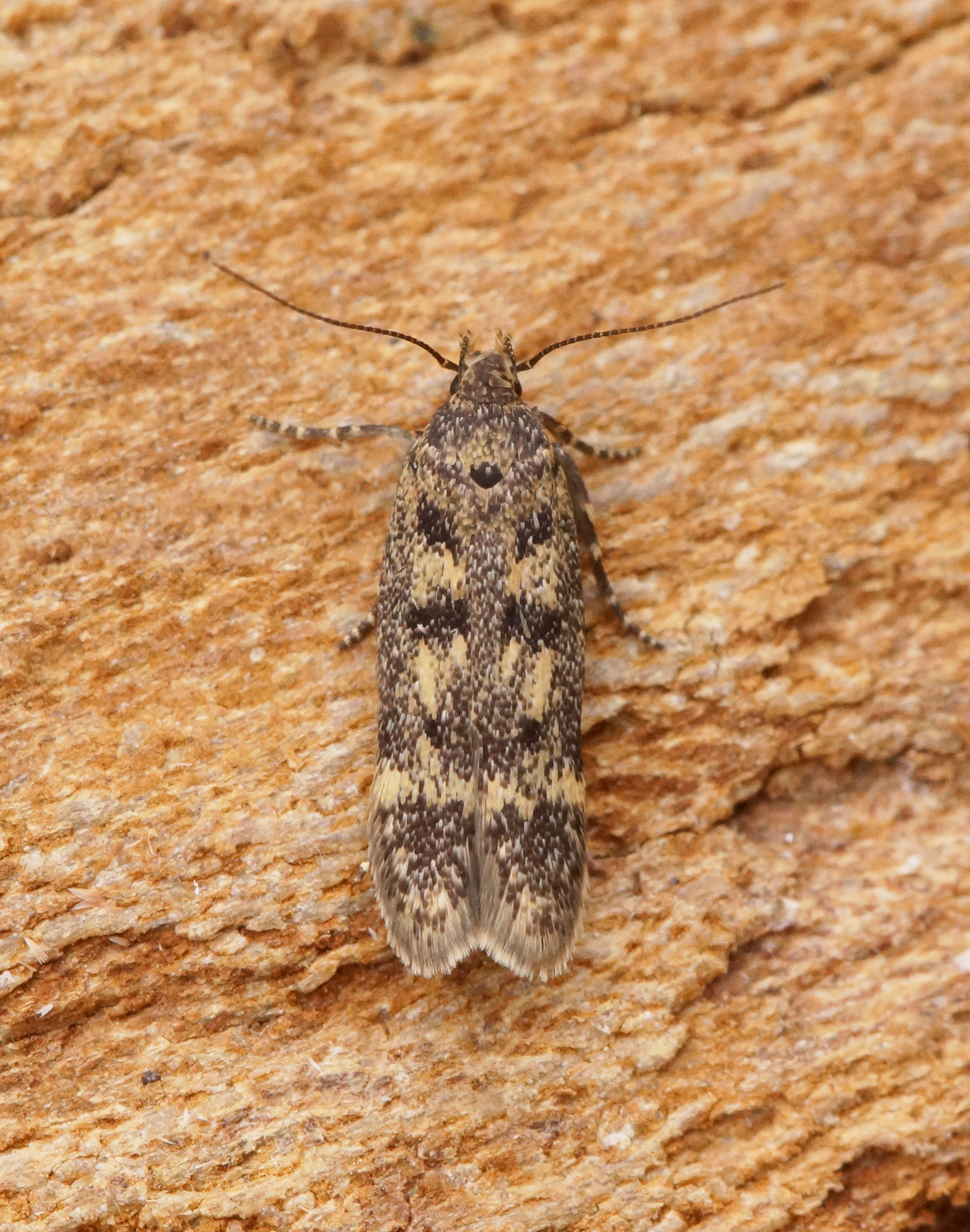

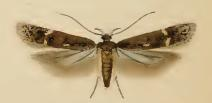

Scientific classification
- Domain: Eukaryota
- Kingdom: Animalia
- Phylum: Arthropoda
- Class: Insecta
- Order: Lepidoptera
- Family: Gelechiidae
- Genus: Bryotropha
- Species: B. affinis

Binomial name
- Bryotropha affinis (Haworth, 1828)

Synonyms
- Recurvaria affinis Haworth, 1828; Gelechia tegulella Herrich-Schäffer, 1854; Gelechia tectella Herrich-Schäffer, 1854; Gelechia affinella Doubleday, 1859; Anacampsoides affinitella Bruand d'Uzelle, 1859

= Bryotropha affinis =

Species of moth

Bryotropha affinis is a moth of the family Gelechiidae. It is found in most of Europe.

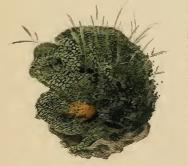
A piece of moss showing frass thrown out by the larva

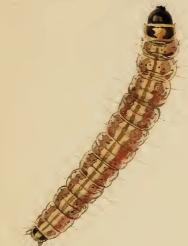
Larva

The wingspan is 9–12 mm. The terminal joint of palpi longer than second. Forewings dark fuscous, sprinkled with whitish; a yellow-whitish basal dot; usually a small black spot in disc towards base; stigmata black, plical followed and two discal connected by yellow-whitish scales; a fine obtusely angulated sometimes interrupted yellowish-white fascia at 3/4. Hindwings light grey. Larva pinkish, paler on each side of dorsal line, darker-marbled on sides; dots black, very inconspicuous; head and plate of 2 black. Stainton’s confinis seems to be a dark northern form.

Adults are on wing from June to July in the UK, and from May to September more generally. The larvae feed on mosses on walls and thatch in both open country and urban areas.
