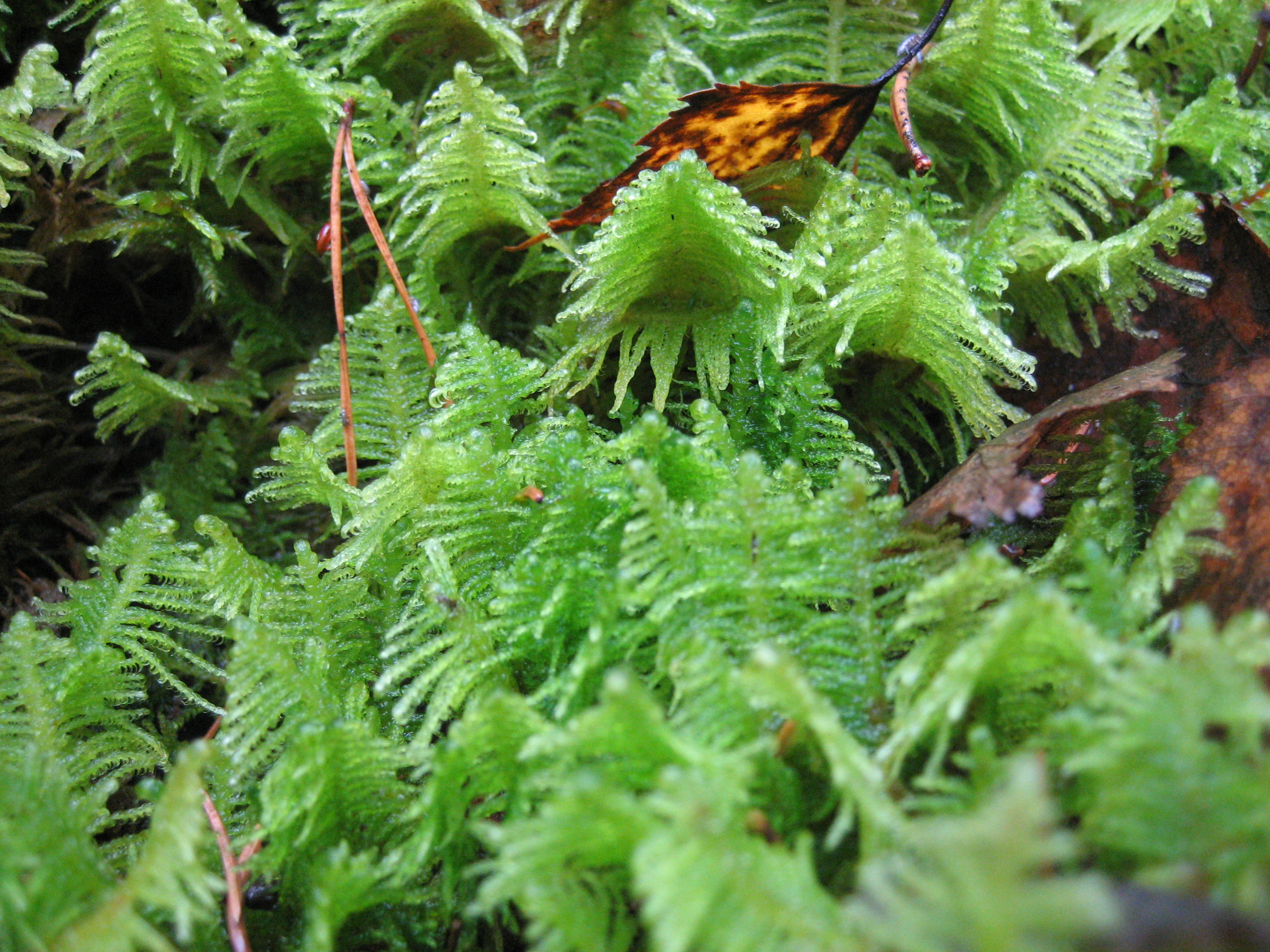
- P. crista-castrensis in Finland

Scientific classification
- Kingdom: Plantae
- Division: Bryophyta
- Class: Bryopsida
- Subclass: Bryidae
- Order: Hypnales
- Family: Pylaisiaceae
- Genus: Ptilium
- Species: P. crista-castrensis

Binomial name
- Ptilium crista-castrensis (Hedw.) De Not.

= Ptilium crista-castrensis =

Species of moss

Ptilium crista-castrensis, the knights plume moss or ostrich-plume feathermoss, is a species of moss within the family Pylaisiaceae, in the class Bryopsida, subclass Bryidae and order Hypnales.

== Ecology ==
This species occurs on the floor of Canadian boreal forests as well as many forests of northern Europe; an example of this occurrence is within the black spruce/feathermoss climax forest, often having moderately dense canopy and featuring a forest floor of feathermosses including Hylocomium splendens, Pleurozium schreberi and Ptilium crista-castrensis.
