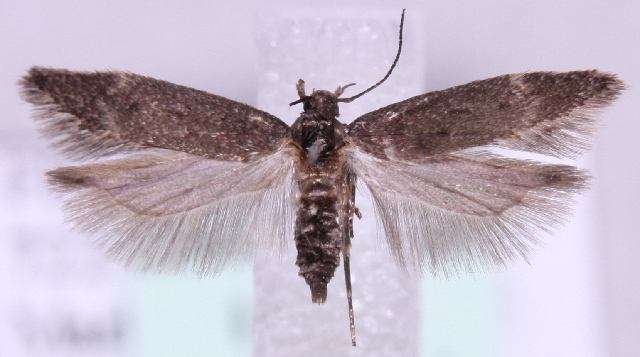

Scientific classification
- Kingdom: Animalia
- Phylum: Arthropoda
- Clade: Pancrustacea
- Class: Insecta
- Order: Lepidoptera
- Family: Gelechiidae
- Genus: Bryotropha
- Species: B. similis

Binomial name
- Bryotropha similis (Stainton, 1854)

Synonyms
- Gelechia similis Stainton, 1854; Gelechia thuleella Zeller (in Staudinger), 1857; Gelechia similella Doubleday, 1859; Gelechia pullifimbriella Clemens, 1863; Gelechia confinis Stainton, 1871; Gelechia obscurecinerea Nolcken, 1871; Gelechia stolidella Morris, 1872; Gelechia fuliginosella Snellen, 1882; Bryotropha fuliginosella; Gelechia clandestina Meyrick, 1923; Duvita tahavusella Forbes, 1922; Bryotropha dufraneella de Joannis, 1928; Bryotropha novisimilis Li & Zheng, 1997

= Bryotropha similis =

Species of moth

Bryotropha similis is a moth of the family Gelechiidae. It has a Holarctic distribution, including Greenland and Iceland. It is widespread in northern, central and eastern Europe. In southern Europe, it is only known from a few mountainous regions. It is also found throughout the Palaearctic.

The wingspan is 11–13 mm. The terminal joint of palpi longer than second. Forewings dark fuscous, somewhat paler sprinkled; stigmata indistinctly blackish, first discal beyond plical; a faint slender obtusely angulated pale fascia at 3, forming an indistinct ochreous-whitish spot on costa. Hindwings grey, paler anteriorly.

Adults have been recorded on wing from early June to late August, probably in one generation per year.
