= Bryotropha altitudophila =

Scientific classification
- Kingdom: Animalia
- Phylum: Arthropoda
- Clade: Pancrustacea
- Class: Insecta
- Order: Lepidoptera
- Family: Gelechiidae
- Genus: Bryotropha
- Species: B. altitudophila

Binomial name
- Bryotropha altitudophila Rutten & Karsholt, 2004

Species of moth

Bryotropha altitudophila is a moth of the family Gelechiidae. It is found in central North America, from Saskatchewan to Mexico in the south.

The wingspan is 11–13 millimetres (0.43–0.51 in). Adults have been recorded on wing from early June to early August. There is probably one generation per year.
