= Bryotropha nupponeni =

Scientific classification
- Kingdom: Animalia
- Phylum: Arthropoda
- Clade: Pancrustacea
- Class: Insecta
- Order: Lepidoptera
- Family: Gelechiidae
- Genus: Bryotropha
- Species: B. nupponeni

Binomial name
- Bryotropha nupponeni Karsholt & Rutten, 2005

Species of moth

Bryotropha nupponeni is a moth of the family Gelechiidae. It is found in the southern Ural region of Russia.

The wingspan is 12–13 mm. Adults have been recorded on wing from June to July.
