= Bryotropha horribilis =

Scientific classification
- Kingdom: Animalia
- Phylum: Arthropoda
- Clade: Pancrustacea
- Class: Insecta
- Order: Lepidoptera
- Family: Gelechiidae
- Genus: Bryotropha
- Species: B. horribilis

Binomial name
- Bryotropha horribilis Rutten & Karsholt, 2005

Species of moth

Bryotropha horribilis is a moth of the family Gelechiidae. It is found in eastern Turkey, northern Iran, Syria, Lebanon and Jordan.

The wingspan is 11–14 mm. Adults have been recorded on wing in June and July.

== Etymology ==
The species name refers to the exclamation of one of the authors after the first glance at the male genitalia of this new species and is derived from Latin horribilis (meaning horrible or ghastly).

== See also ==
- List of moths of Turkey
- List of moths of Iran
