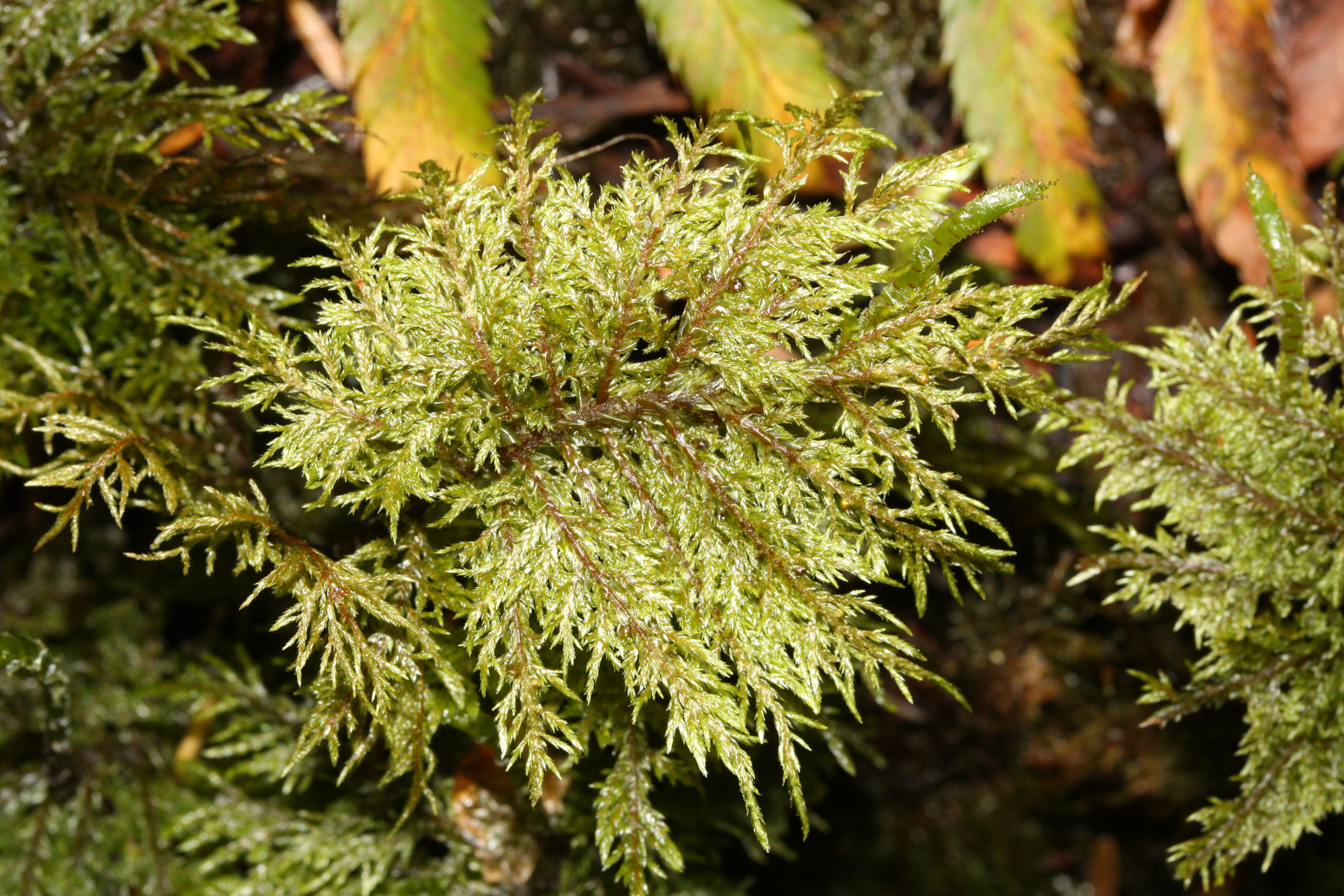

Scientific classification
- Kingdom: Plantae
- Division: Bryophyta
- Class: Bryopsida
- Subclass: Bryidae
- Order: Hypnales
- Family: Hylocomiaceae
- Genus: Hylocomium
- Species: H. splendens

Binomial name
- Hylocomium splendens (Hedw.) Schimp.

= Hylocomium splendens =

Species of moss

Hylocomium splendens, commonly known as glittering woodmoss, splendid feather moss, stairstep moss, and mountain fern moss, is a perennial clonal moss with a widespread distribution in Northern Hemisphere boreal forests. It is commonly found in Europe, Russia, Alaska and Canada, where it is often the most abundant moss species. It also grows in the Arctic tundra and further south at higher elevations in, for example, northern California, western Sichuan, East Africa, Australia, New Zealand and the West Indies. In Scotland it is a characteristic species of the Caledonian Forest. Under the UK's national vegetation classification system, pinewood community W18 is named as "Pinus sylvestris-Hylocomium splendens woodland", indicating its significance in this ecosystem.

== Morphology ==
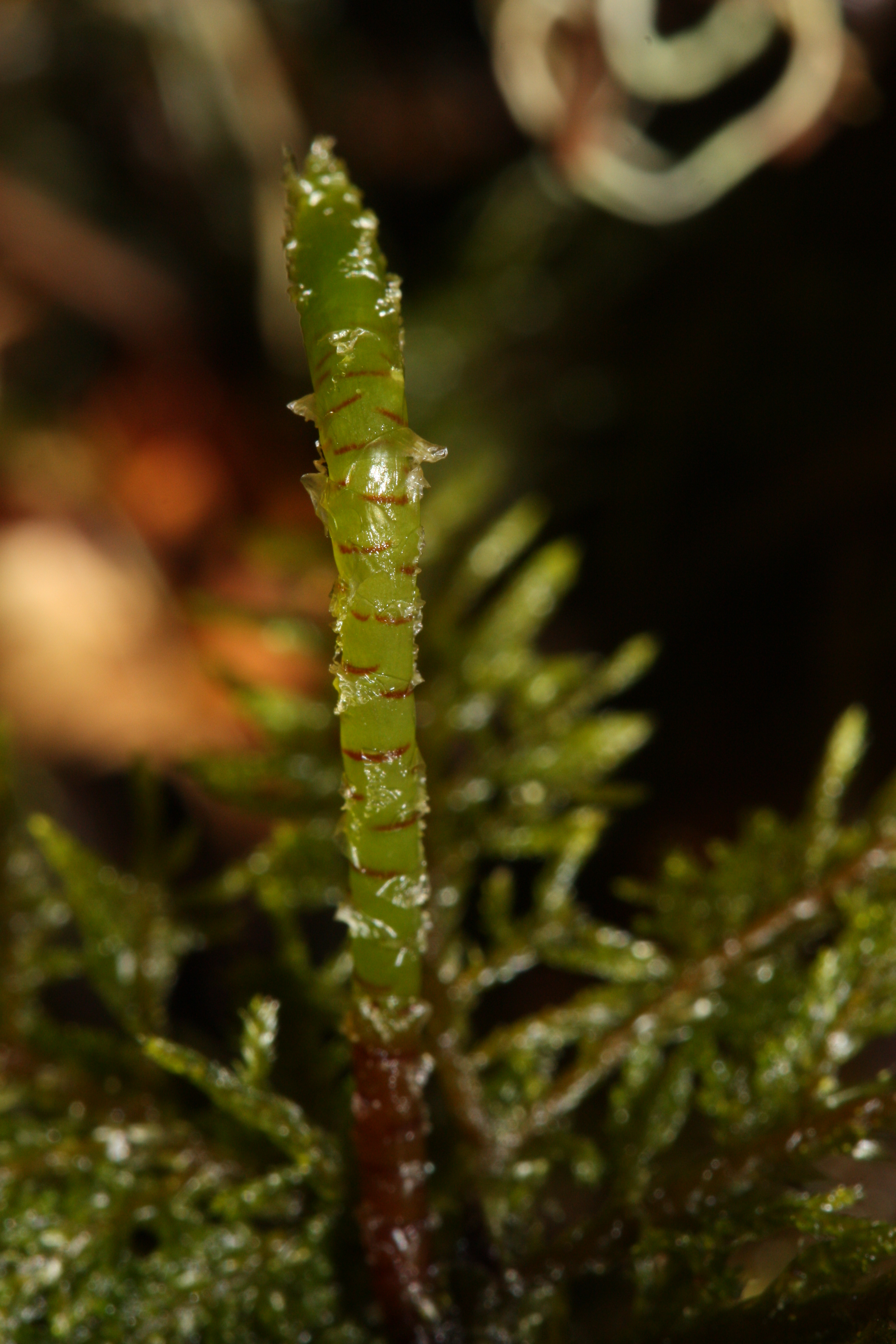
Close up taken in Mount Baker–Snoqualmie National Forest

It is generally olive green, yellowish or reddish green in colour, with reddish stems and branches. These often form branches up to 20 cm (7.9 in) long, with current year's growth starting from near the middle of the previous year's branch. This produces feathery fronds in steps. It is possible to estimate the age of a plant by counting the steps – a new level being produced each year. This form of growth enables the species to "climb" over other mosses and forest debris that falls on it. It is shade-loving, grows in soil and humus and on decaying wood and often forms mats with living parts growing on top of older, dead or dying sections. Further south, the plants are larger with several steps; further north, in the arctic tundra, the plants are smaller with few steps.

== Ecology ==
Occurring widely in the boreal forests, this plant is often found on forest floors even in relatively harsh northern latitudes. In Canada, for example, according to C. Michael Hogan the black spruce/feathermoss climax forest often occurs with moderately dense canopy featuring a forest floor of feathermosses that include H. splendens, Pleurozium schreberi and Ptilium crista-castrensis. Experiments simulating global change with increased nutrient deposits and warming indicate that increased nutrient deposits and climate warming may have negative impact on growth of Hylocomium splendens.

== Use ==
The species has a commercial use in floral exhibitions and for lining fruit and vegetable storage boxes. In the past it was utilised as a floor covering for dirt floors. In Alaska and northern Canada it is still used for filling the gaps between the logs in log cabins. It has anti-bacterial qualities and may also contain anti-tumour agents.

H. splendens is used for bio-geochemical mapping in Northern Europe. Through spectrometry techniques such as plasma-mass spectrometry, 38 elements can be examined for airborne heavy metal pollution.
