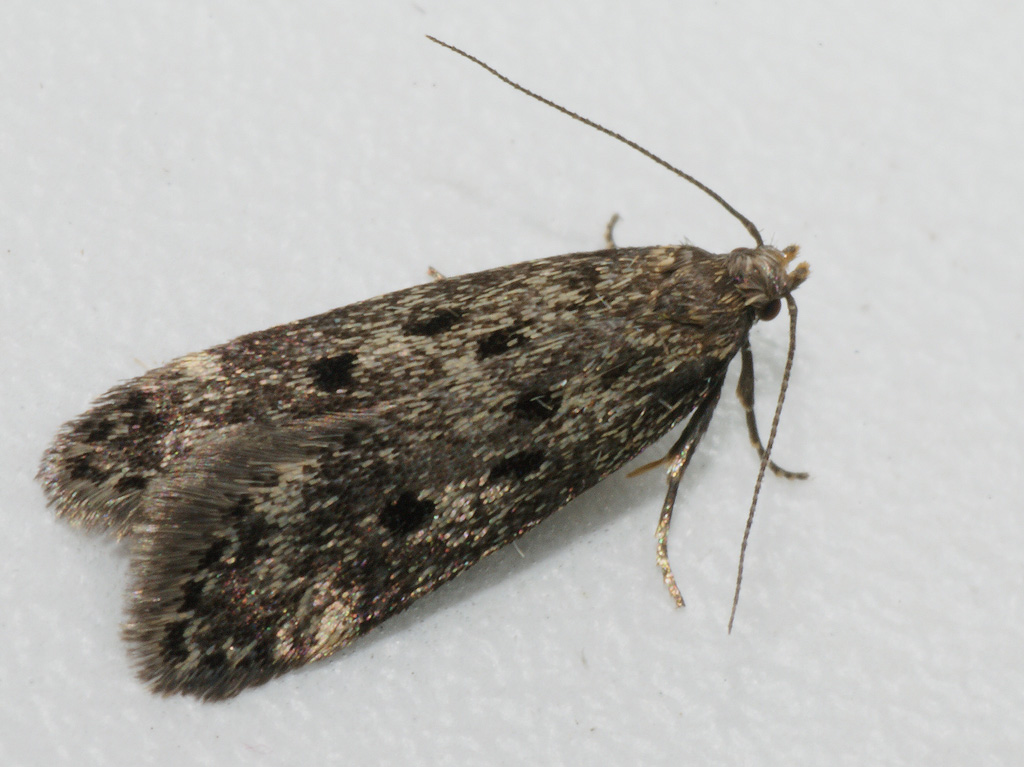

Scientific classification
- Kingdom: Animalia
- Phylum: Arthropoda
- Clade: Pancrustacea
- Class: Insecta
- Order: Lepidoptera
- Family: Gelechiidae
- Genus: Bryotropha
- Species: B. galbanella

Binomial name
- Bryotropha galbanella (Zeller, 1839)

Synonyms
- Gelechia galbanella Zeller, 1839; Gelechia angustella Heinemann, 1870; Gelechia ilmatariella Hoffmann, 1893; Gelechia galbanella var. griseella Caradja, 1920; Gelechia galbanella var. haareki Strand, 1920; Gelechia fusconigratella Palm, 1947

= Bryotropha galbanella =

Species of moth

Bryotropha galbanella is a moth of the family Gelechiidae. It is found in Denmark, Norway, Sweden, Finland, Estonia, Latvia, Great Britain, France, the Netherlands, Germany, Poland, Austria, the Czech Republic, Italy, Romania and Russia. It is also found in Japan and North America (Alaska and extreme north-western Canada). Furthermore, it was incorrectly recorded from Chile.

The wingspan is 14–18 mm for males and 13–16 mm for females. Adults have been recorded on wing from May to August.

The larvae feed on Dicranum scoparium. They live in a silken tube. In captivity, larvae have also been reared on Homalothecium lutescens. They have a pale brown body.
