= Bryotropha rossica =

Scientific classification
- Kingdom: Animalia
- Phylum: Arthropoda
- Clade: Pancrustacea
- Class: Insecta
- Order: Lepidoptera
- Family: Gelechiidae
- Genus: Bryotropha
- Species: B. rossica

Binomial name
- Bryotropha rossica Anikin & Piskunov, 1996

Synonyms
- Bryotropha tachengensis Li & Zheng, 1997

Species of moth

Bryotropha rossica is a moth of the family Gelechiidae. It is found in southern Russia, Kazakhstan, north-western China and Estonia.

The wingspan is 12–13 mm. Adults have been recorded on wing from May to July.
