= Bryotropha tachyptilella =

Scientific classification
- Kingdom: Animalia
- Phylum: Arthropoda
- Class: Insecta
- Order: Lepidoptera
- Family: Gelechiidae
- Genus: Bryotropha
- Species: B. tachyptilella

Binomial name
- Bryotropha tachyptilella (Rebel, 1916)

Synonyms
- Lita tachyptilella Rebel, 1916

Species of moth

Bryotropha tachyptilella is a moth of the family Gelechiidae. It is found in Slovakia, Hungary, Romania, Bulgaria, Greece, Turkey and Ukraine.

The wingspan is 14–15 mm. Adults have been recorded on wing from May to July and in early September.
