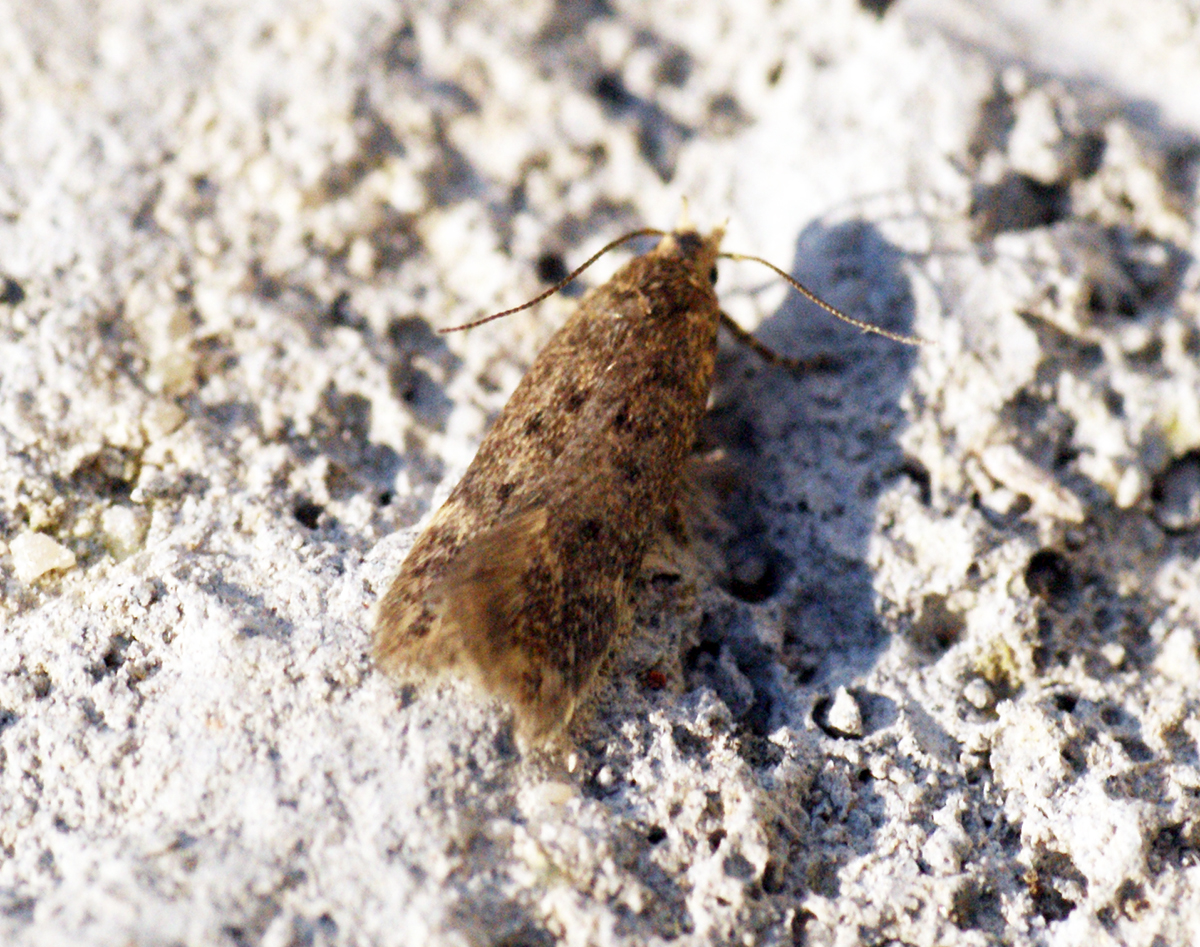

Scientific classification
- Kingdom: Animalia
- Phylum: Arthropoda
- Clade: Pancrustacea
- Class: Insecta
- Order: Lepidoptera
- Family: Gelechiidae
- Genus: Bryotropha
- Species: B. senectella

Binomial name
- Bryotropha senectella (Zeller, 1839)

Synonyms
- Gelechia senectella Zeller, 1839; Gelechia ciliatella Herrich-Schäffer, 1854; Bryotropha obscurella Heinemann, 1870; Bryotropha minorella Heinemann, 1870; Bryotropha phoebusella Millière, 1876; Bryotropha larseni Strand, 1927

= Bryotropha senectella =

Species of moth

Bryotropha senectella is a moth of the family Gelechiidae. It is found throughout Europe.

The wingspan is 9–13 mm. The terminal joint of palpi is longer than second. The forewings are light ochreous, mixed with fuscous, or wholly fuscous with a dark fuscous spot in disc near base; stigmata dark fuscous, first discal beyond plical; an indistinct angulated pale fascia at 3/4, preceded by a dark costal spot. Hindwings light grey.

Adults have been recorded on wing from June to early September.The larvae feed on mosses.
