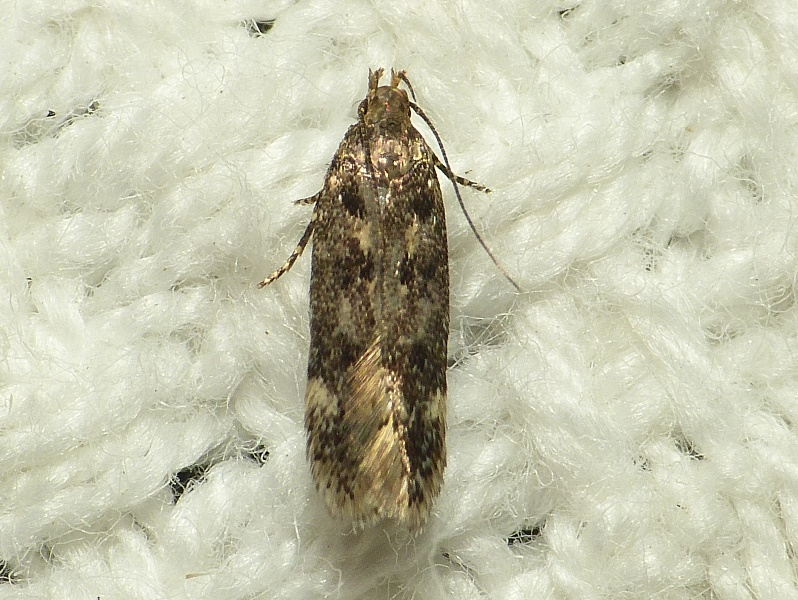

Scientific classification
- Kingdom: Animalia
- Phylum: Arthropoda
- Clade: Pancrustacea
- Class: Insecta
- Order: Lepidoptera
- Family: Gelechiidae
- Genus: Bryotropha
- Species: B. basaltinella

Binomial name
- Bryotropha basaltinella (Zeller, 1839)

Synonyms
- Gelechia basaltinella Zeller, 1839

= Bryotropha basaltinella =

Species of moth

Bryotropha basaltinella is a moth of the family Gelechiidae. It is found in Great Britain, the Benelux, Germany, France, Spain, Switzerland, Austria, Hungary, Slovakia, the Czech Republic and Poland.

The wingspan is 11–12 mm.
