= Rhytidiopsis =

Scientific classification
- Kingdom: Plantae
- Division: Bryophyta
- Class: Bryopsida
- Subclass: Bryidae
- Order: Hypnales
- Family: Hylocomiaceae
- Genus: Rhytidiopsis; Broth.
- Species: R. robusta

Binomial name
- Rhytidiopsis robusta Brotherus, 1908

Genus of plants

Rhytidiopsis is a monotypic genus of mosses belonging to the family Hylocomiaceae. The only species is Rhytidiopsis robusta.

The species is found in Northern America.
