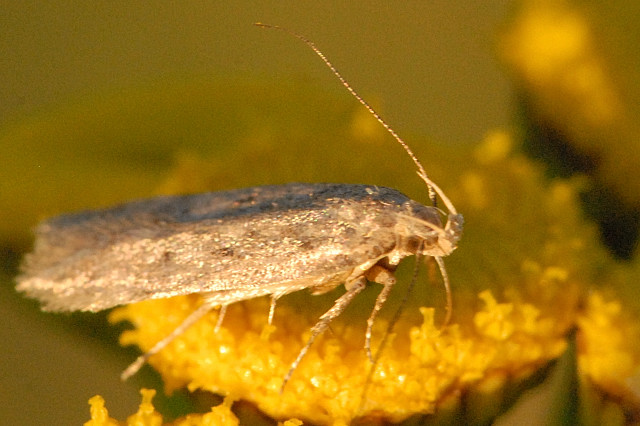
- Adult Bryotropha terrella at Commanster (Belgian Ardennes)

Scientific classification
- Kingdom: Animalia
- Phylum: Arthropoda
- Clade: Pancrustacea
- Class: Insecta
- Order: Lepidoptera
- Family: Gelechiidae
- Subfamily: Gelechiinae
- Genus: Bryotropha; Heinemann, 1870

Type species
- Tinea terrella Denis & Schiffermüller, 1775

Species
- Many, see text

Synonyms
- Briotropha (lapsus); Bryothropha (lapsus); Bryotrocha (lapsus); Mniophaga Pierce & Daltry, 1938; Adelphotropha Gozmány, 1955

= Bryotropha =

Genus of moths

Bryotropha is a genus of the twirler moth family (Gelechiidae). Among these, it is placed in the tribe Anomologini of subfamily Gelechiinae; the tribe was formerly considered a distinct subfamily Anomologinae.

== Species ==
Species of Bryotropha are:

- horribilis-group
  - Bryotropha horribilis Rutten & Karsholt, 2005
  - Bryotropha sabulosella (Rebel, 1905)
- domestica-group
  - Bryotropha domestica (Haworth, 1828)
  - Bryotropha vondermuhlli Nel & Brusseaux, 2003
- terrella-group
  - Bryotropha rossica Anikin & Piskunov, 1996
  - Bryotropha azovica Bidzilia, 1997
  - Bryotropha arabica Amsel, 1952
  - Bryotropha brevivalvata Li & Zheng, 1997
  - Bryotropha patockai Elsner & Karsholt, 2003
  - Bryotropha purpurella (Zetterstedt, 1839)
  - Bryotropha parapurpurella Bidzilya, 1998
  - Bryotropha elegantula Li & Zheng, 1997
  - Bryotropha tachyptilella (Rebel, 1916)
  - Bryotropha italica Karsholt & Rutten, 2005
  - Bryotropha politella (Stainton, 1851)
  - Bryotropha aliterrella (Rebel, 1935)
  - Bryotropha nupponeni Karsholt & Rutten, 2005
  - Bryotropha terrella
  - Bryotropha sattleri Nel, 2003
  - Bryotropha desertella (Douglas, 1850)
  - Bryotropha palliptera Li & Wang, 2000
  - Bryotropha wolschrijni Karsholt & Rutten, 2005
  - Bryotropha heckfordi Karsholt & Rutten, 2005
- similis-group
  - Bryotropha figulella (Staudinger, 1859)
  - Bryotropha plantariella (Tengström, 1848)
  - Bryotropha galbanella (Zeller, 1839)
  - Bryotropha gemella Rutten & Karsholt, 2004
  - Bryotropha boreella (Douglas, 1851)
  - Bryotropha phycitiniphila Karsholt & Rutten, 2005
  - Bryotropha sutteri Karsholt & Rutten, 2005
  - Bryotropha gallurella Amsel, 1952
  - Bryotropha hendrikseni Karsholt & Rutten, 2005
  - Bryotropha pallorella Amsel, 1952 (= B. mulinoides)
  - Bryotropha hulli Karsholt & Rutten, 2005
  - Bryotropha plebejella (Zeller, 1847)
  - Bryotropha dryadella (Zeller, 1850) (= B. saralella)
  - Bryotropha basaltinella (Zeller, 1839)
  - Bryotropha affinis (Haworth, 1828)
  - Bryotropha umbrosella (Zeller, 1839) (= B. mundella)
  - Bryotropha similis (Stainton, 1854) (= B. dufraneella)
  - Bryotropha svenssoni Park, 1984
  - Bryotropha senectella (Zeller, 1839)
  - Bryotropha hodgesi Rutten & Karsholt, 2004
  - Bryotropha branella (Busck, 1908)
  - Bryotropha altitudophila Rutten & Karsholt, 2004
  - Bryotropha montana Li & Zheng, 1997

== Former species ==
- Bryotropha plurilineella Chrét (nomen nudum)
