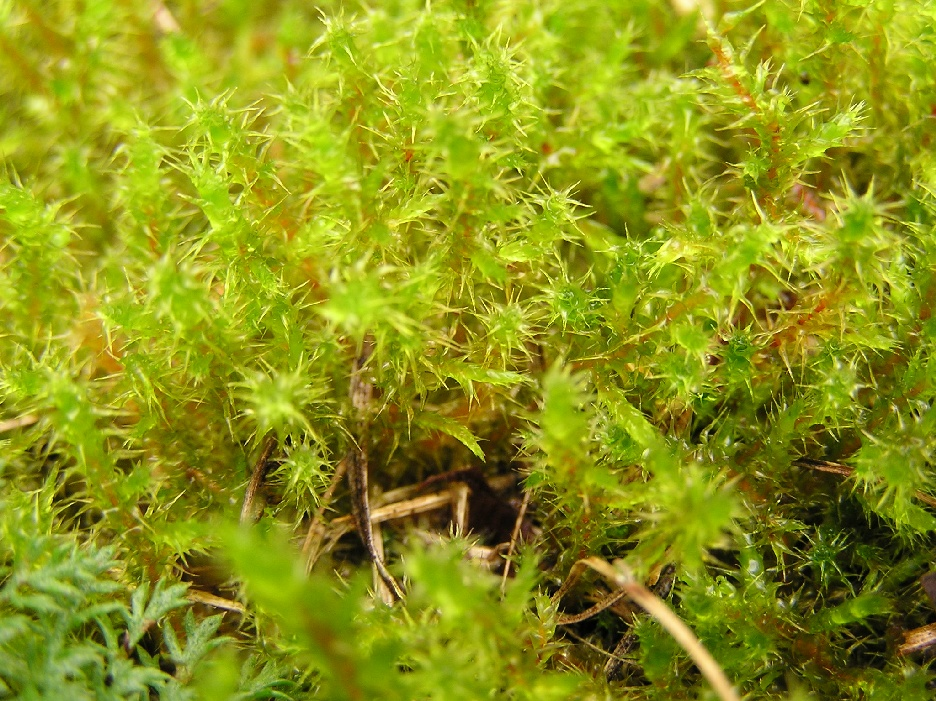
- Rhytidiadelphus squarrosus

Scientific classification
- Kingdom: Plantae
- Division: Bryophyta
- Class: Bryopsida
- Subclass: Bryidae
- Order: Hypnales
- Family: Hylocomiaceae
- Genus: Rhytidiadelphus (Lindb. ex Limpr.) Warnst.

= Rhytidiadelphus =

Genus of mosses

Rhytidiadelphus is a genus of mosses belonging to the family Hylocomiaceae.

The genus was first described by Karl Gustav Limpricht in 1906.

The genus has cosmopolitan distribution.

Species:

- Rhytidiadelphus japonicus T. Koponen, 1971
- Rhytidiadelphus loreus Warnstorf, 1906
- Rhytidiadelphus printzii Kaalaas, 1919
- Rhytidiadelphus squarrosus Warnstorf, 1906
- Rhytidiadelphus triquetrus Warnstorf, 1906
