= Bryotropha heckfordi =

Scientific classification
- Kingdom: Animalia
- Phylum: Arthropoda
- Clade: Pancrustacea
- Class: Insecta
- Order: Lepidoptera
- Family: Gelechiidae
- Genus: Bryotropha
- Species: B. heckfordi

Binomial name
- Bryotropha heckfordi Karsholt & Rutten, 2005

Species of moth

Bryotropha heckfordi is a moth of the family Gelechiidae. It is found in mountainous areas of central and northern Spain.

The wingspan is 14–15 mm. Adults have been recorded on wing from July to August.
