= Bryotropha figulella =

Scientific classification
- Kingdom: Animalia
- Phylum: Arthropoda
- Class: Insecta
- Order: Lepidoptera
- Family: Gelechiidae
- Genus: Bryotropha
- Species: B. figulella

Binomial name
- Bryotropha figulella (Staudinger, 1859)

Synonyms
- Gelechia figulella Staudinger, 1859; Gelechia capnella Constant, 1865; Bryotropha cinnamomea Turati, 1934

Species of moth

Bryotropha figulella is a moth of the family Gelechiidae. It is found along the Atlantic coast of France and the coasts of the Mediterranean Sea, including Algeria and Libya. There is a dubious record from Great Britain.

The wingspan is 11–16 mm. Adults have been recorded on wing from late April to early October probably in two generations per year.

The larvae possibly feed on Silene nicaeensis.
