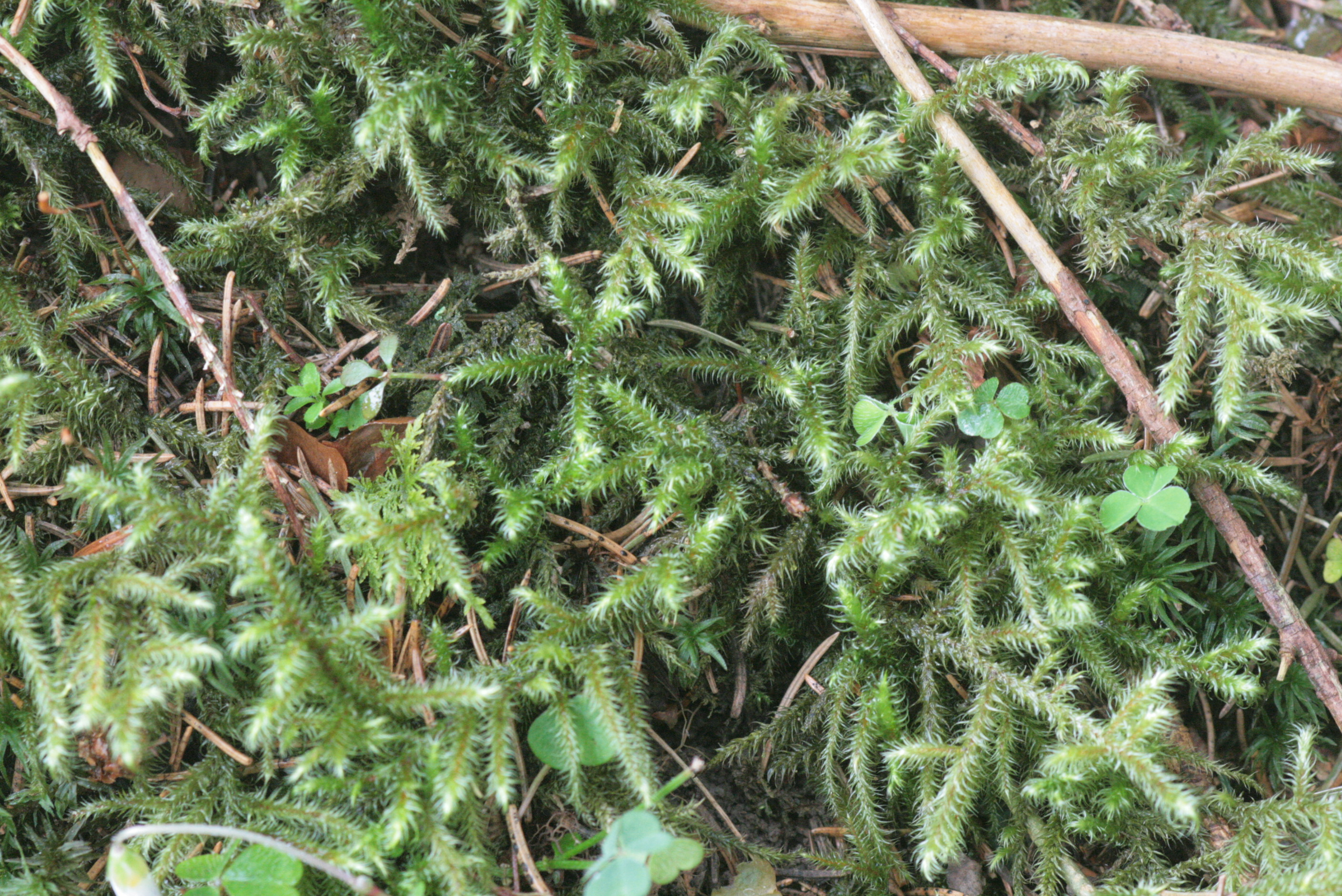

Scientific classification
- Kingdom: Plantae
- Clade: Embryophytes
- Division: Bryophyta
- Class: Bryopsida
- Subclass: Bryidae
- Order: Hypnales
- Family: Hylocomiaceae
- Genus: Rhytidiadelphus
- Species: R. loreus

Binomial name
- Rhytidiadelphus loreus (Hedw.) Warnst.

Synonyms
- Hypnum loreum Hedw.

= Rhytidiadelphus loreus =

Species of moss

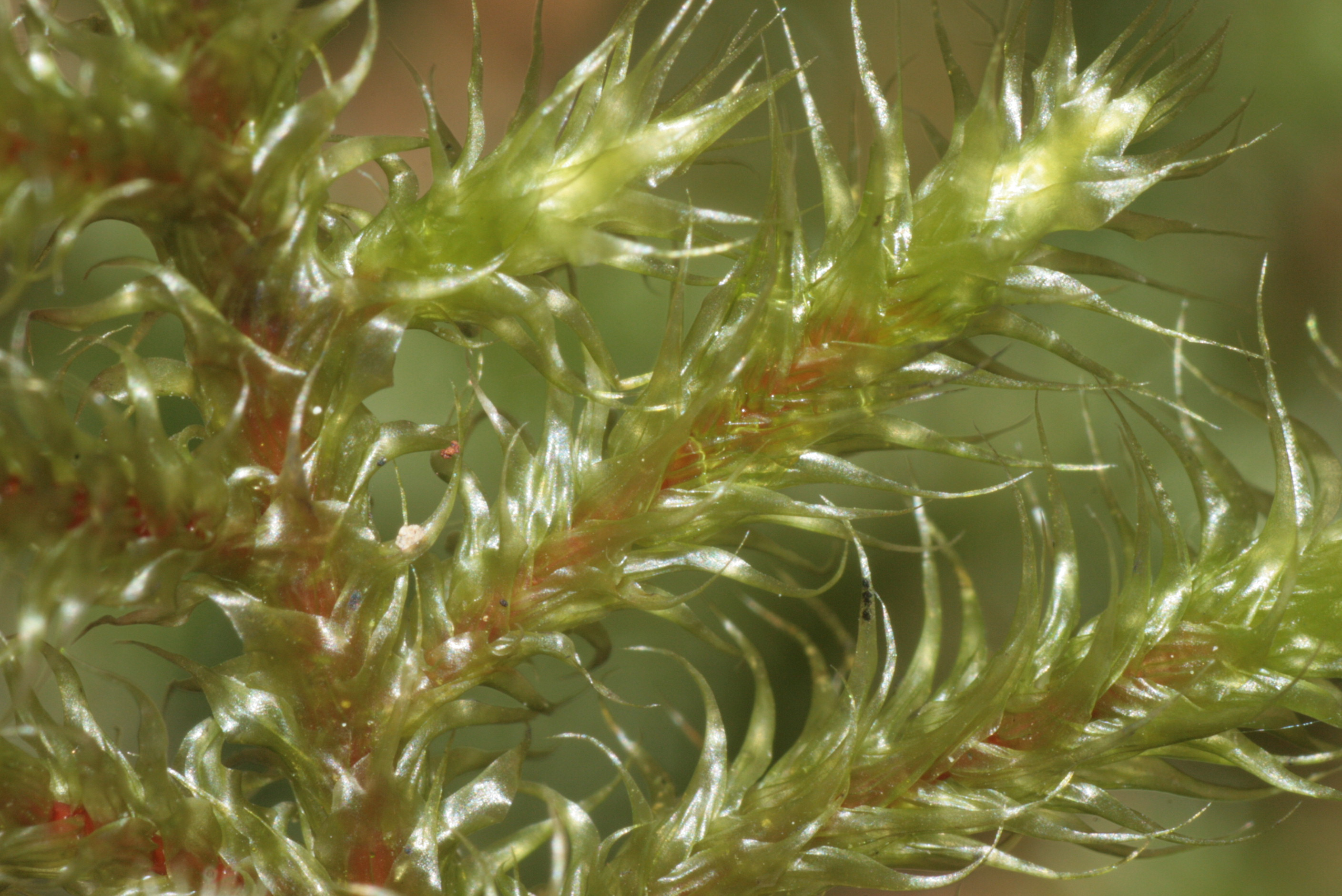
Closeup of Rhytidiadelphus loreus branching structures

Rhytidiadelphus loreus, also commonly known as lanky moss and little shaggy moss, is a nonvascular "feather moss" species that is a key component of a healthy, thriving forest ecosystem. Lanky moss grows in North America, Canada and Europe. It is primarily a coastal species that grows in moist, coniferous and deciduous forests, acidic grasslands and in the UK, heathy slopes on mountains. It grows on decaying logs, the forest floor and as an epiphyte on living trees. Its key functions in the ecosystem are water retention and temperature insulation.

== Physical characteristics ==
=== Description ===
Rhytidiadelpus loreus, is a large, creeping, branched species of moss. This moss has a striped appearance because of the formation of the pleated leaves. The leaves are glossy, heart-shaped or cordate and grow in an irregular arrangement on pinnate branches. The leaves can grow to be 4–5 millimeters long. The coloration of the leaves on lanky moss range from shades of yellow to dark olive green. The stems of the plant are rigid and have a brown and red appearance. Lanky moss can grow horizontally and outward. This growth formation creates large, interwoven and unconstrained mats acting as a carpet on the surrounding area of the forest floor. Lanky moss is seemingly prickly but the leaves are soft to the touch and have a spongy quality to them. These mats can grow up to 15 centimeters (5.9 in) in thickness, spreading across the surface of the forest floor. They act an insulator as well as a water and nutritional retainer.

== Reproduction ==
Rhytidiadelpus loreus is a dioicous plant in which male and female gametes are produced on separate individuals. The sporophytes have an irregular formation and growth pattern. The species reproduces occasionally and seemingly sporadically. The sporophytes protrude out of the stem, 2 to 6 centimeters (0.8 to 2.4 in) long, into a long stalk forming a sub-spherical sporangium. The spore's maturation season is in the winter months when the temperature is cold.

== Habitat ==
Rhytidiadeplhus loreus is widespread and can be found in United States, Canada and Europe. In the United States it is specifically located in southeast Alaska, California and eastern Montana. While in Canada it can be found in the providences of British Columbia, New Brunswick, Nova Scotia and Quebec. Lanky moss can also be found in parts of Europe, mostly in mountainous regions where moisture can be trapped in shaded pockets of the mountains. It grows in north-western Europe in countries such as Norway, Iceland, Ireland, Greenland and in northern and western parts of the UK. Lanky moss is usually a coastal species that grows in moist environments, preferably in shady, dark locations. It can be found in low elevation to subalpine elevations of 4,000 ft (1,200 m). In coniferous forests it is a dominant species of moss that covers the forest floor. It commonly covers decomposing wood such as a fallen trees or rotting logs. Lanky moss can also grow on rocks. It can also take on epiphytic qualities and grow at the base of living trees. Lanky moss grows exceptionally well on soil types such as raw humus, acid humus or peat. This is due to the amount of moisture, decaying matter and nitrogen in these top layers of soil that lanky moss can thrive on. Rhytidiadeplhus loreus is a flourishing and abundant moss that is not at risk of extinction. It is not listed on the COSEWIC website.

== Similar species ==
Rhytidiadeplus loreus is similar to other feather mosses in the genera Rhytidiadelphus and Kinbergia, particularly the bent-leaf moss and the goose-necked moss. The goose-necked moss's branches are shorter than the lanky moss branches. The Kindbergia species that is located in British Columbia is smaller Rhytidiadelphus loreus and has more complex branch structure. Kindbergia oregana is a yellow- light green moss compared to lanky moss and grows in a similar loose mat structure. Kindbergia oregana is similarly a coastal moss species and grows at similar elevations on decaying logs or in an epiphytic manner like the lanky moss. Its major difference is that it is more contained and regular in its growth patterns compared to the lanky moss. Kindbergia praelonga is also like the lanky moss because of its irregularity in structure and growth.

== Importance ==
=== Forest ===
One of the essential limiting nutrients in a healthy forest is nitrogen. Nitrogen is a limiting resource in a forest because not all plants can utilize atmospheric nitrogen. Even though Rhytidiadelphus loreus is not a nitrogen fixer it still helps keep the forest healthy and in balance. Lanky moss can serve as an insulator, nutrition sponge and a water filtration system that circulates throughout the forest. As an insulator it can protect the possibly weak or shallow root systems of trees by insulating them from extreme changes in temperature. It there was no insulation then many of the trees growing at colder latitude could not survive the harsh winter months. The insulation of lanky moss prevents the roots from freezing if there is an unexpected drop in temperature. They can also help retain moisture in the soil so if there is a dry season in the forest they can help keep the trees and other plant species hydrated. Aside from water retention they can also hold large levels of nutrients. As rain percolates through the forest’s canopy, nutrients such as nitrogen flows off with the water and is immediately absorbed by the lanky moss that is growing on the forest floor. Moss such as lanky moss is a crucial component in primary successional success. After a major disturbance such as a fire or glacial advancement, moss and lichen are initial species in the regrowth of vegetation. Since other feather mosses unlike Rhytidiadelphus loreus are capable of nitrogen fixation they are able to facilitate growth of other species because they can introduce a crucial nutrient into the growing forest.

== Uses ==
=== Traditional ===
Lanky moss along with other moss species have been used for medicinal, practical and artistic purposes by local indigenous communities. It has a long history of uses and is not only a key species in a prospering forest but is also serves an essential role in cultural traditions. Indigenous people living in North America used moss as a raw material to make baskets, clothes and protecting insulation for their homes. They used it medicinally as a wound dressing and as a tool to stop excessive bleeding because of its incredible ability to absorb or retain liquid. They would use lanky moss to steam food such as roots or bulbs and to trap heat in their houses during the cold season. Moss can also be used in the process of distilling alcohol such as whisky.

=== Commercial ===
Rhytidiadeplhus loreus is a beautiful decorative moss. Its many uses range from placement in store windows, material to build figurines or could be placed in a hanging flower box. It can also be used in Christmas decorations. It has become a very commercialized and successful product that has fueled a rapidly increasing demand for natural decorations. Florists have created mosseries where moss such as lanky moss is grown commercially and then packaged and sold to floral shops who wish to use the moss in displays or floral arrangements. The aesthetic appreciation for moss has grown in popularity with the emergence of Japanese gardening and commercialized landscaping. Moss needs little maintenance, which makes it a perfect lawn or garden substitute. Because of its high water retention and drought resistance capabilities, Lanky Moss is an environmentally friendly as well as cost affective alternative to grass lawns. A downside to moss is that it can inhibit new tree growth by possibly suffocating seedling success and blocking any available water to enter the root systems. All in all, Rhytidiadelphus loreus is a key component of a healthy, sustainable ecosystem.
