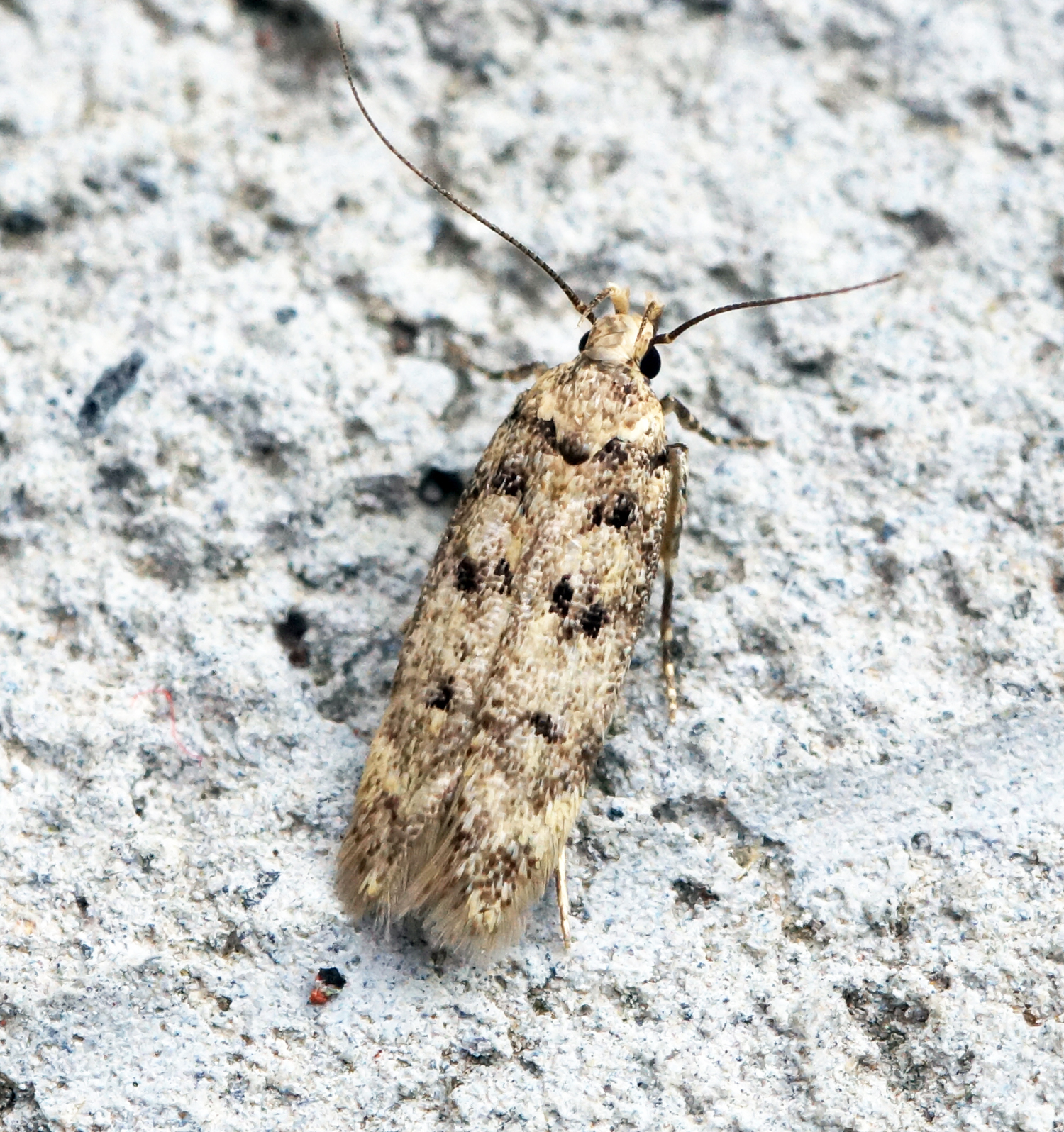

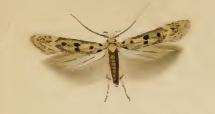

Scientific classification
- Kingdom: Animalia
- Phylum: Arthropoda
- Clade: Pancrustacea
- Class: Insecta
- Order: Lepidoptera
- Family: Gelechiidae
- Genus: Bryotropha
- Species: B. domestica

Binomial name
- Bryotropha domestica (Haworth, 1828)

Synonyms
- Recurvaria domestica Haworth, 1828; Gelechia domesticella Doubleday, 1859; Lita punctata Staudinger in Kalchberg, 1876; Gelechia domestica var. salmonis Walsingham, 1908; Bryotropha algiricella Chrétien, 1917

= Bryotropha domestica =

Species of moth

Bryotropha domestica is a moth of the family Gelechiidae. It is found from Ireland to Germany, Slovakia, Romania and Bulgaria and from the Benelux to the Iberian Peninsula, Sicily, Crete and Cyprus. It is also found in Morocco, Algeria, Tunisia, Libya, the Middle East, Turkmenistan, Saudi Arabia and Yemen.

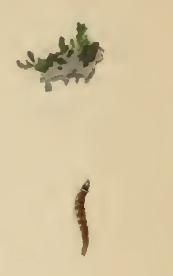
Moss being eaten by larva

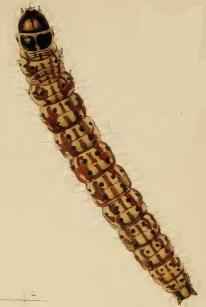
Larva

The wingspan is 12–13 mm. The head is pale whitish- ochreous, sprinkled with fuscous. Terminal joint of palpi longer than second. Forewings whitish-ochreous, irrorated with fuscous; small black spots on base of costa and dorsum, and one in disc near base; stigmata black first discal above plical; a somewhat angulated pale fascia at 3/4, preceded by a blackish costal spot. Hindwings pale grey. Larva reddish- brown, paler on each side of dorsal line, sides marbled with paler; spots black, conspicuous; head and plate of 2 blackish.

Adults are on wing from mid-May to early August in one generation per year. The larva feeds on mosses on walls.
