= Bryotropha hodgesi =

Scientific classification
- Kingdom: Animalia
- Phylum: Arthropoda
- Clade: Pancrustacea
- Class: Insecta
- Order: Lepidoptera
- Family: Gelechiidae
- Genus: Bryotropha
- Species: B. hodgesi

Binomial name
- Bryotropha hodgesi Rutten & Karsholt, 2004

Species of moth

Bryotropha hodgesi is a moth of the family Gelechiidae. It is found along the western coast of the United States, north to the extreme southern part of Canada.

The wingspan is 10–12 millimetres (0.39–0.47 in).

== Etymology ==
The species is named in honour of R.W. Hodges.
