= Bryotropha gallurella =

Scientific classification
- Kingdom: Animalia
- Phylum: Arthropoda
- Class: Insecta
- Order: Lepidoptera
- Family: Gelechiidae
- Genus: Bryotropha
- Species: B. gallurella

Binomial name
- Bryotropha gallurella Amsel, 1952

Species of moth

Bryotropha gallurella is a moth of the family Gelechiidae. It is found in Portugal, Spain, southern France, Corsica, Sardinia, and Sicily.

The wingspan is 11–14 mm. Adults have been recorded on wing from late March to early October, probably in two generations per year.
