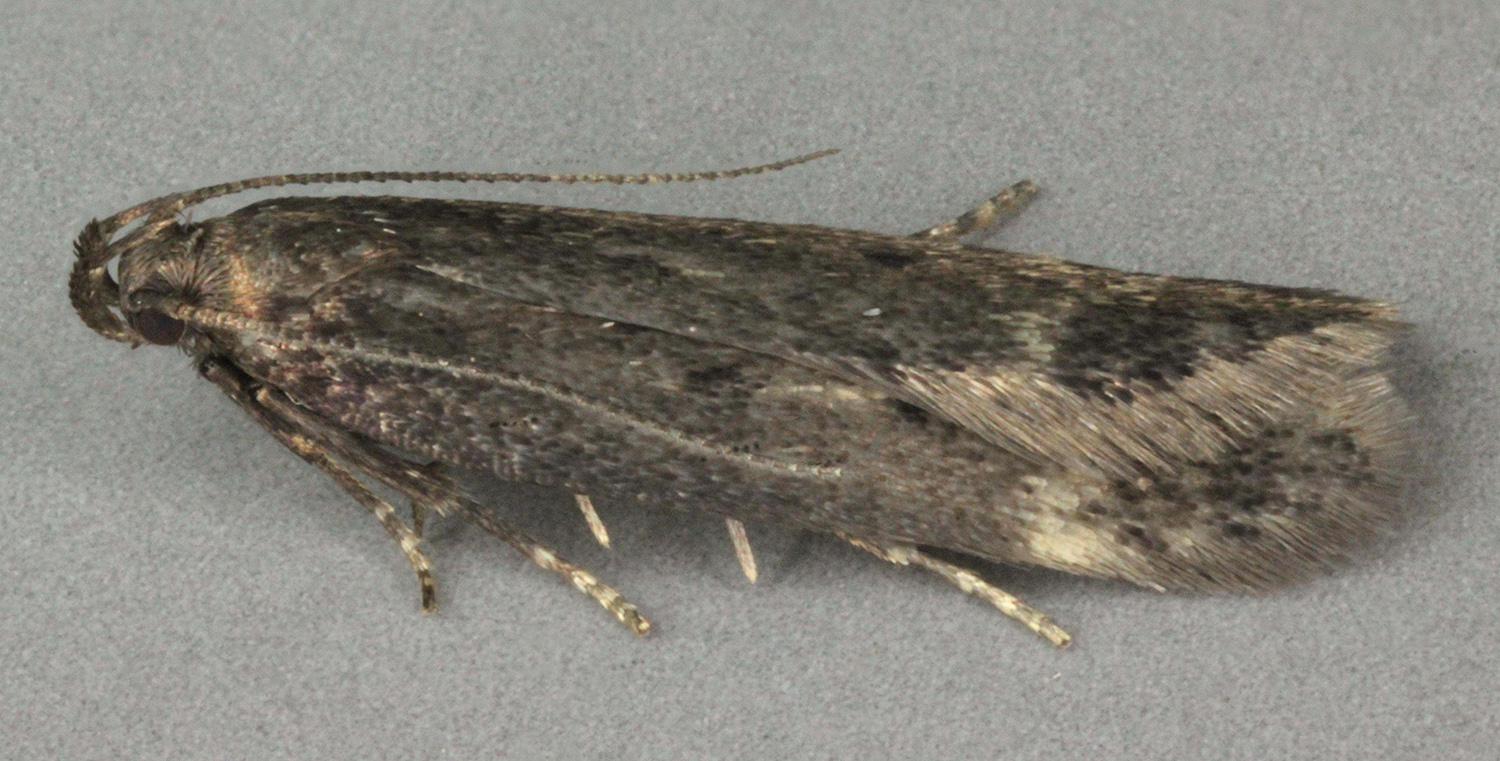

Scientific classification
- Domain: Eukaryota
- Kingdom: Animalia
- Phylum: Arthropoda
- Class: Insecta
- Order: Lepidoptera
- Family: Gelechiidae
- Genus: Bryotropha
- Species: B. boreella

Binomial name
- Bryotropha boreella (Douglas, 1851)

Synonyms
- Gelechia boreella Douglas, 1851

= Bryotropha boreella =

Species of moth

Bryotropha boreella is a moth of the family Gelechiidae. It has a disjunct alpine-boreal distribution. It is locally common in central and northern Europe, northern England and Scotland. In Scandinavia, it is found in north-western Denmark, Sweden and Finland. It is also present in the French Alps, Germany (Sauerland, the Harz and the Alps) and Austria. Records from the Ural need confirmation.

The wingspan is 13–15 mm for males and 11–12 mm for females. Adults have been recorded on wing from June to early August. The males fly in the late morning sunshine, while females mostly hide down in the vegetation.
