= Bryotropha elegantula =

Scientific classification
- Kingdom: Animalia
- Phylum: Arthropoda
- Class: Insecta
- Order: Lepidoptera
- Family: Gelechiidae
- Genus: Bryotropha
- Species: B. elegantula

Binomial name
- Bryotropha elegantula Li & Zheng, 1997

Species of moth

Bryotropha elegantula is a moth of the family Gelechiidae. It is found in Qinghai, China.
