= Bryotropha patockai =

Scientific classification
- Kingdom: Animalia
- Phylum: Arthropoda
- Clade: Pancrustacea
- Class: Insecta
- Order: Lepidoptera
- Family: Gelechiidae
- Genus: Bryotropha
- Species: B. patockai

Binomial name
- Bryotropha patockai Elsner & Karsholt, 2003

Species of moth

Bryotropha patockai is a moth of the family Gelechiidae. It is found in the Czech Republic, Slovakia, Hungary, Croatia and Ukraine.

The wingspan is 14–15 mm. Adults have been recorded on wing from June to July.
