= Bryotropha hendrikseni =

Scientific classification
- Kingdom: Animalia
- Phylum: Arthropoda
- Clade: Pancrustacea
- Class: Insecta
- Order: Lepidoptera
- Family: Gelechiidae
- Genus: Bryotropha
- Species: B. hendrikseni

Binomial name
- Bryotropha hendrikseni Karsholt & Rutten, 2005

Species of moth

Bryotropha hendrikseni is a moth of the family Gelechiidae. It is found in Italy, Croatia, North Macedonia, Bulgaria, Greece, Crete, Cyprus, Turkey, Ukraine and Turkmenistan.

The wingspan is 12–14 mm. Adults have been recorded on wing from May to early September.
