= Bryotropha plantariella =

Scientific classification
- Kingdom: Animalia
- Phylum: Arthropoda
- Class: Insecta
- Order: Lepidoptera
- Family: Gelechiidae
- Genus: Bryotropha
- Species: B. plantariella

Binomial name
- Bryotropha plantariella (Tengström, 1848)

Synonyms
- Gelechia plantariella Tengström, 1848; Gelechia cinerosella Tengström, 1848; Gelechia serrulatella Tengström, 1848; Bryotropha brevipalpella Rebel, 1893

Species of moth

Bryotropha plantariella is a moth of the family Gelechiidae. It is found in Norway, Sweden, Finland, north-eastern Germany, Lithuania, Latvia, Estonia, Poland, Belarus, Russia (including Siberia) and North America. Records from Austria, the Czech Republic and Slovakia need confirmation.

The wingspan is 11–13 mm for males and 11–12 mm for females. Adults have been recorded on wing from May to July.

The larvae possibly feed on Sphagnum species.
