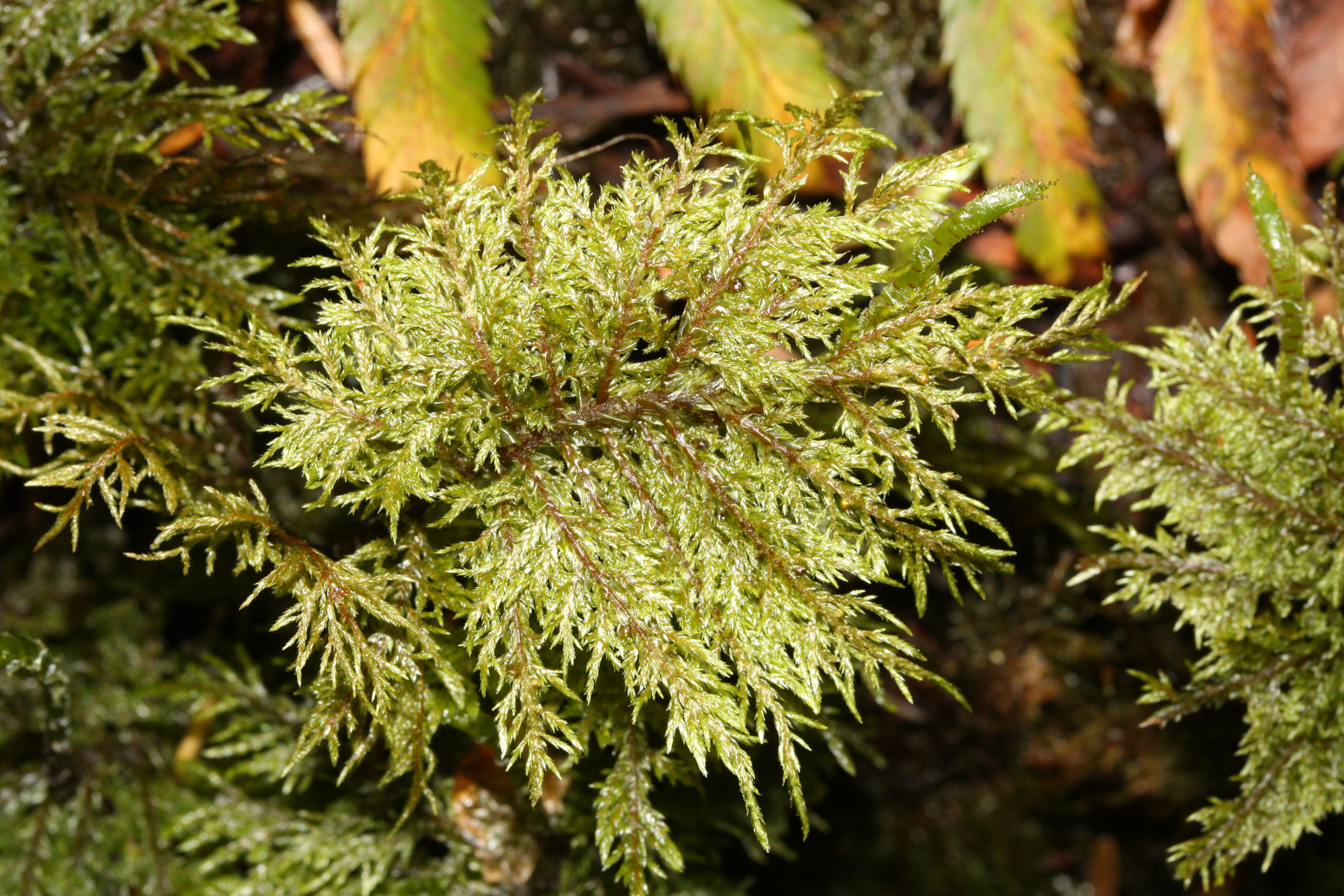
- Hylocomium splendens

Scientific classification
- Kingdom: Plantae
- Division: Bryophyta
- Class: Bryopsida
- Subclass: Bryidae
- Order: Hypnales
- Family: Hylocomiaceae
- Genus: Hylocomium; Schimp.

= Hylocomium =

Genus of mosses

Hylocomium is a genus of mosses belonging to the family Hylocomiaceae.

The genus was first described by Wilhelm Philippe Schimper in 1852.

Species:

- Hylocomium interruptum Margadant, 1972
- Hylocomium splendens W.P. Schimper, 1852
- Hylocomiastrum umbratum (Ehrh. ex Hedw.) M. Fleisch.
