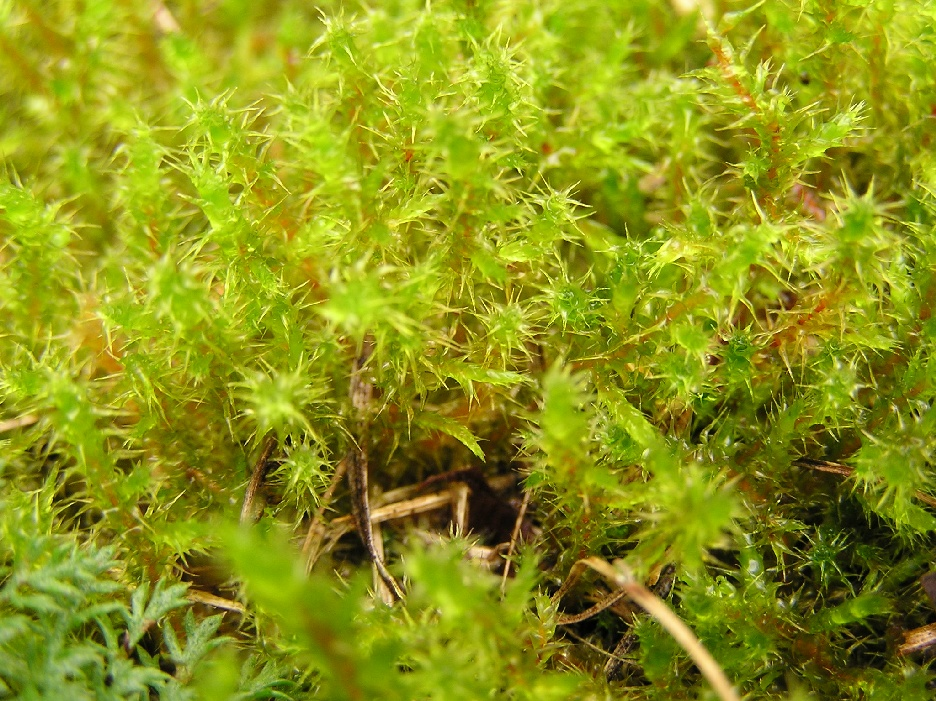

Scientific classification
- Kingdom: Plantae
- Clade: Embryophytes
- Division: Bryophyta
- Class: Bryopsida
- Subclass: Bryidae
- Order: Hypnales
- Family: Hylocomiaceae
- Genus: Rhytidiadelphus
- Species: R. squarrosus

Binomial name
- Rhytidiadelphus squarrosus (Hedw.) Warnst.

Synonyms
- Hypnum squarrosum Hedw.

= Rhytidiadelphus squarrosus =

Species of moss

Rhytidiadelphus squarrosus is a species of moss known as springy turf-moss in the United Kingdom, and square goose neck moss in the United States. It is widespread in Eurasia and North America, and has been introduced to the Southern Hemisphere. It has broad ecological tolerances, and is usually found in man-made habitats such as lawns and golf courses. It is most closely related to R. subpinnatus, with which it is often confused.

== Description ==
Rhytidiadelphus squarrosus grows as an extensive mat of branching stems, up to 15 centimetres (6 in) tall, sheathed in leaves that are 2–2.5 mm (0.08–0.10 in) long and bend sharply back at a right angle, and thus spread outwards from the stem. The leaf bases are broad and include a pair of short nerves. The plant rarely produces capsules, so most of the species' reproduction is asexual.

== Distribution ==
Rhytidiadelphus squarrosus has a circumpolar distribution in the Northern Hemisphere, being found across much of Eurasia, and parts of North America, including British Columbia, Alaska, Washington, Oregon, Newfoundland and Labrador and Greenland.

It has also been introduced to northeastern North America, Tasmania and New Zealand, where it is now an invasive species. The first specimen to be collected in the Southern Hemisphere was taken in 1974 in Dundas Creek, western Tasmania, but the first published record came the following year, from a golf course in Dunedin on New Zealand's South Island.

== Ecology ==
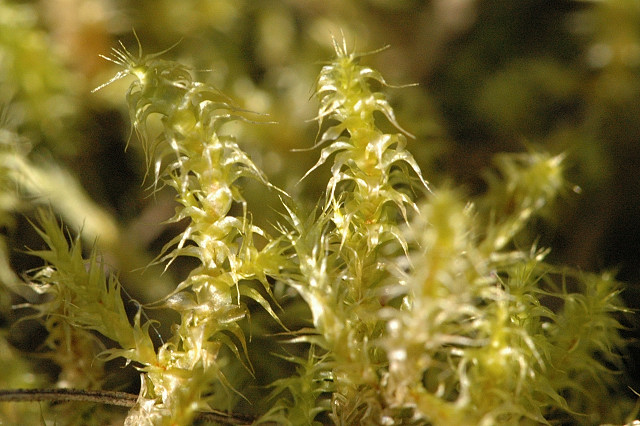
R. squarrosus growing in the Belgian Ardennes

It tolerates a wide variety of soil conditions, from calcareous grassland to acid heaths. It grows most conspicuously in heavily grazed pastures and on the regularly mown fairways on golf courses, and is the most common moss found in lawns in the United Kingdom. It is almost always found in association with humans, leaving its original habitat unclear; it may have evolved as a plant of coastal meadows.

== Taxonomy ==
Rhytidiadelphus squarrosus was formally named (as Hypnum squarrosum) by Johann Hedwig in his 1801 work Species Muscorum, which is considered the starting point for the nomenclature of most mosses.

Although R. squarrosus and R. subpinnatus have sometimes been considered varieties of a single species, particularly by botanists from the United States, studies using microsatellites show them to be separate. The two are often confused, however, and reports of R. squarrosus may sometimes refer to R. subpinnatus. Indeed, both R. subpinnatus and R. japonicus were originally described as infraspecific taxa within R. squarrosus.

In contrast to R. triquetrus and R. loreus, R. squarrosus, R. subpinnatus and R. japonicus have leaves which are not pleated. R. squarrosus differs from R. japonicus in having a long point at the leaf tips, and from R. subpinnatus in the closer spacing of the leaves on the stem, such that the stem can only be seen through the bases of the leaves; in R. subpinnatus, parts of the stem are visible directly.

A new genus, Rhytidiastrum, has been proposed for a group of species including R. squarrosus and R. subpinnatus, but not R. triquetrus.

== Response to herbicide application ==
In a study of the effect of the herbicide Asulam on moss growth, Rhytidiadelphus squarrosus was shown to have intermediate sensitivity to Asulam exposure.

== Etymology ==
The genus name Rhytidiadelphus derives from the words Rhytidium and ἀδελφός (adelfós, brother), implying a close relationship to the genus Rhytidium. The specific epithet squarrosus refers to the leaves, which are squarrose, having a right-angled bend which causes the tips to extend away from the stem.
