= Asulam =

Weed control herbicide

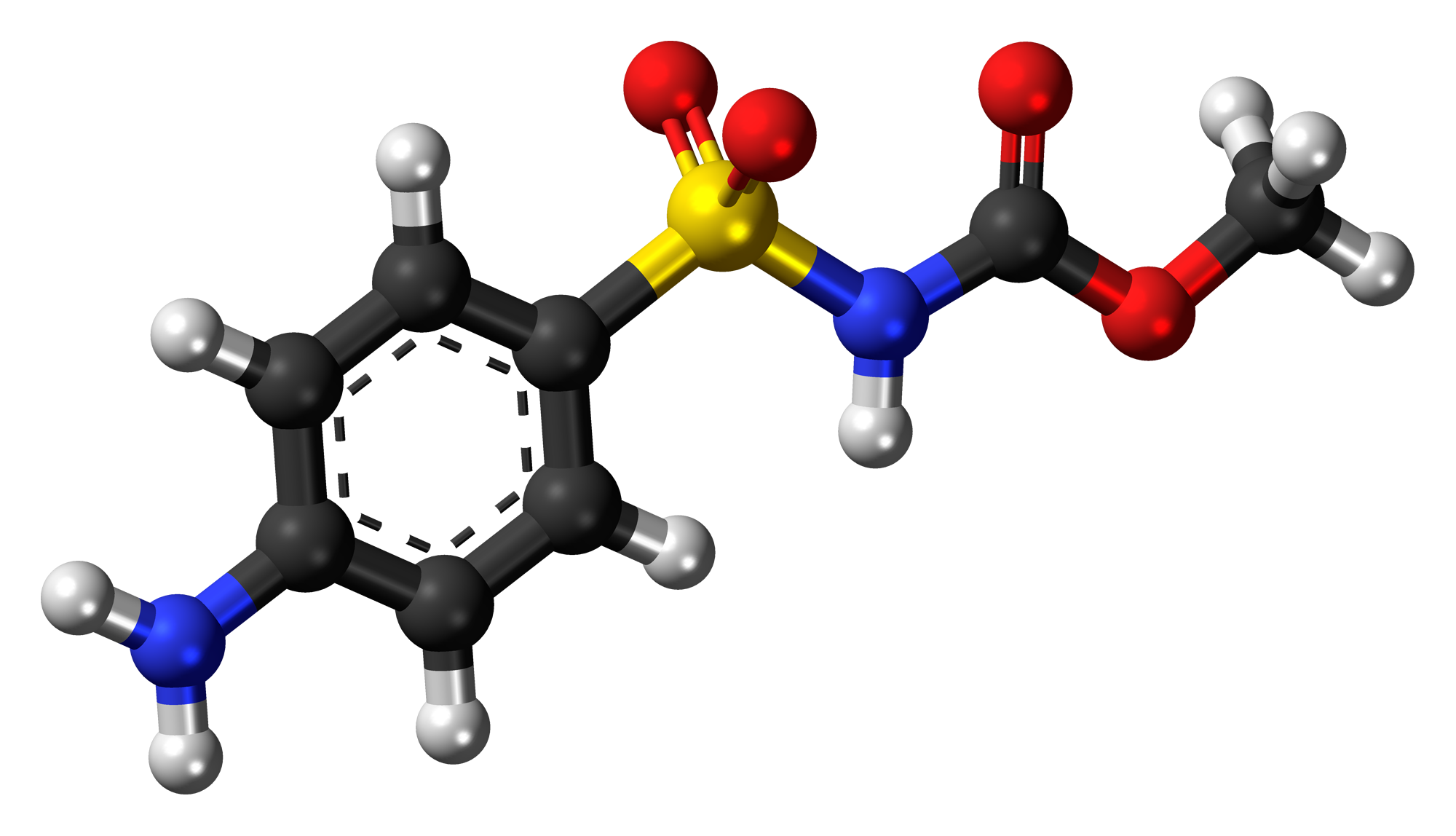

Names
- Preferred IUPAC name Methyl (4-aminobenzene-1-sulfonyl)carbamate

Identifiers
CAS Number	3337-71-1
3D model (JSmol)	Interactive image
ChEBI	CHEBI:81696
ChemSpider	17707
ECHA InfoCard	100.020.071
KEGG	C18350
PubChem CID	18752
UNII	0Y5ASM7P5S
CompTox Dashboard (EPA)	DTXSID8023890
- InChI: InChI=1S/C8H10N2O4S/c1-14-8(11)10-15(12,13)7-4-2-6(9)3-5-7/h2-5H,9H2,1H3,(H,10,11) Key: VGPYEHKOIGNJKV-UHFFFAOYSA-N; InChI=1/C8H10N2O4S/c1-14-8(11)10-15(12,13)7-4-2-6(9)3-5-7/h2-5H,9H2,1H3,(H,10,11) Key: VGPYEHKOIGNJKV-UHFFFAOYAJ
- SMILES: O=S(=O)(c1ccc(N)cc1)NC(=O)OC

Properties
Chemical formula	C_{8}H_{10}N_{2}O_{4}S
Molar mass	230.241 g/mol
Density	1.419 g/mL
- Except where otherwise noted, data are given for materials in their standard state (at 25 °C [77 °F], 100 kPa). verify (what is ?) Infobox references

Asulam is a herbicide invented by May & Baker Ltd, internally called M&B9057, that is used in horticulture and agriculture to kill bracken and docks. It is also used as an antiviral agent. It is currently marketed, by United Phosphorus Ltd - UPL, as "Asulox" which contains 400 g/L of asulam sodium salt.

== European phase-out and ban ==
Asulam was declared not approved by the Commission Implementing Regulation (EU) No 1045/2011 of 19 October 2011 concerning the non-approval of the active substance asulam. Concerns included: lack of evidence concerning the fate of the toxic metabolite sulfanilamide and other metabolites; the poorly characterised nature of the impurities potentially present in the technical-grade product; toxicity to birds. This decision is given in with Regulation (EC) No 1107/2009 of the European Parliament and of the Council concerning the placing of plant protection products on the market, and amending Commission Decision 2008/934/EC.
