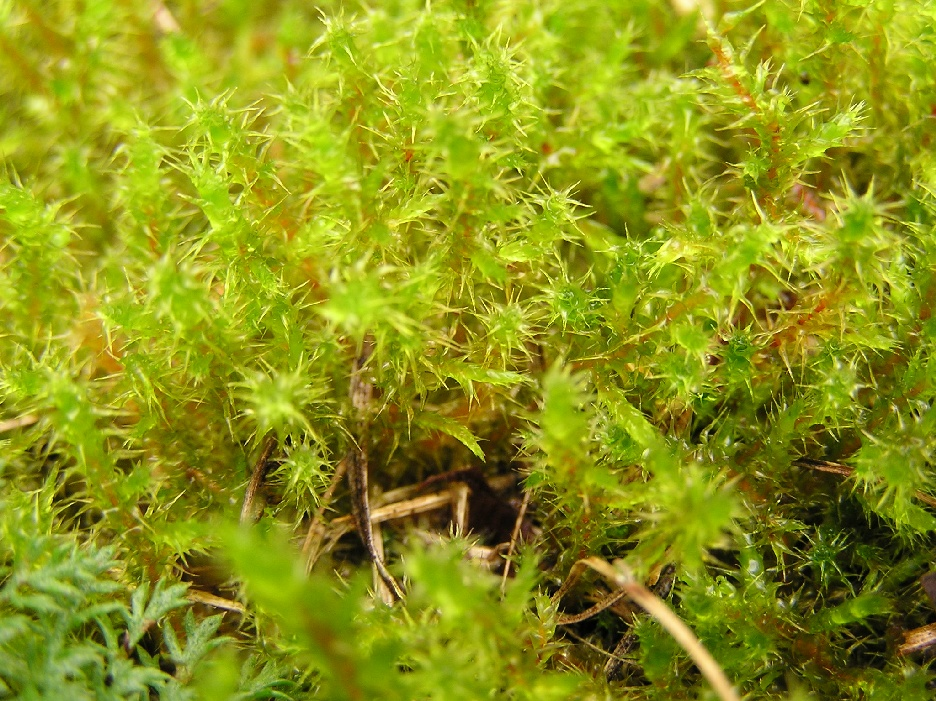
- Rhytidiadelphus squarrosus

Scientific classification
- Kingdom: Plantae
- Division: Bryophyta
- Class: Bryopsida
- Subclass: Bryidae
- Order: Hypnales
- Family: Hylocomiaceae; M. Fleisch.

Genera
- See text.

= Hylocomiaceae =

Family of mosses

Hylocomiaceae is a family of mosses in the order Hypnales. It includes 14 genera and around 36 species.

== Genera ==
Genera include:

- Hylocomiadelphus Ochyra & Stebel
- Hylocomiastrum M. Fleisch. ex Broth.
- Hylocomium Schimp.
- Leptocladiella M. Fleisch.
- Leptohymenium Schwägr.
- Loeskeobryum M. Fleisch. ex Broth.
- Macrothamnium M. Fleisch.
- Meteoriella S. Okamura
- Neodolichomitra Nog.
- Orontobryum Mitt. ex M. Fleisch.
- Pleurozium Mitt.
- Puiggariopsis M. Menzel
- Rhytidiadelphus (Limpr.) Warnst.
- Rhytidiopsis Broth.

=== Formerly included ===
- Ctenidium (Schimp.) Mitt. – now in Hypnaceae
- Schofieldiella W.R. Buck – synonym of Hageniella
