= Xanthotype attenuaria =

Scientific classification
- Kingdom: Animalia
- Phylum: Arthropoda
- Class: Insecta
- Order: Lepidoptera
- Family: Geometridae
- Tribe: Angeronini
- Genus: Xanthotype
- Species: X. attenuaria

Binomial name
- Xanthotype attenuaria Swett, 1918

Species of moth

Xanthotype attenuaria, the attentive crocus soldier moth, is a species of geometrid moth in the family Geometridae. It is found in North America.

The MONA or Hodges number for Xanthotype attenuaria is 6744.
