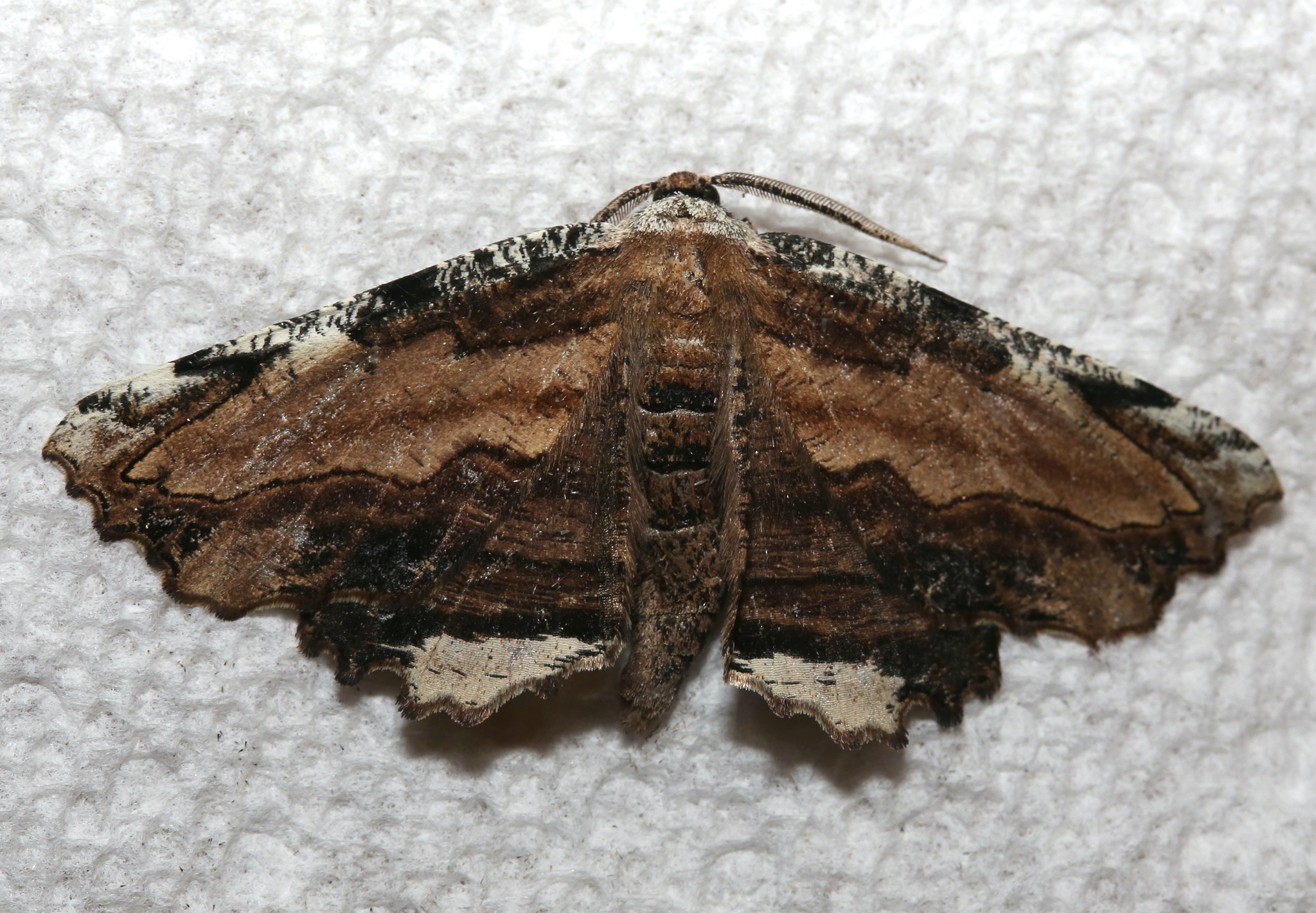

Scientific classification
- Kingdom: Animalia
- Phylum: Arthropoda
- Class: Insecta
- Order: Lepidoptera
- Family: Geometridae
- Tribe: Angeronini
- Genus: Lytrosis
- Species: L. heitzmanorum

Binomial name
- Lytrosis heitzmanorum Rindge, 1971

= Lytrosis heitzmanorum =

Species of moth

Lytrosis heitzmanorum is a species of geometrid moth in the family Geometridae. It is found in North America.

The MONA or Hodges number for Lytrosis heitzmanorum is 6722.
