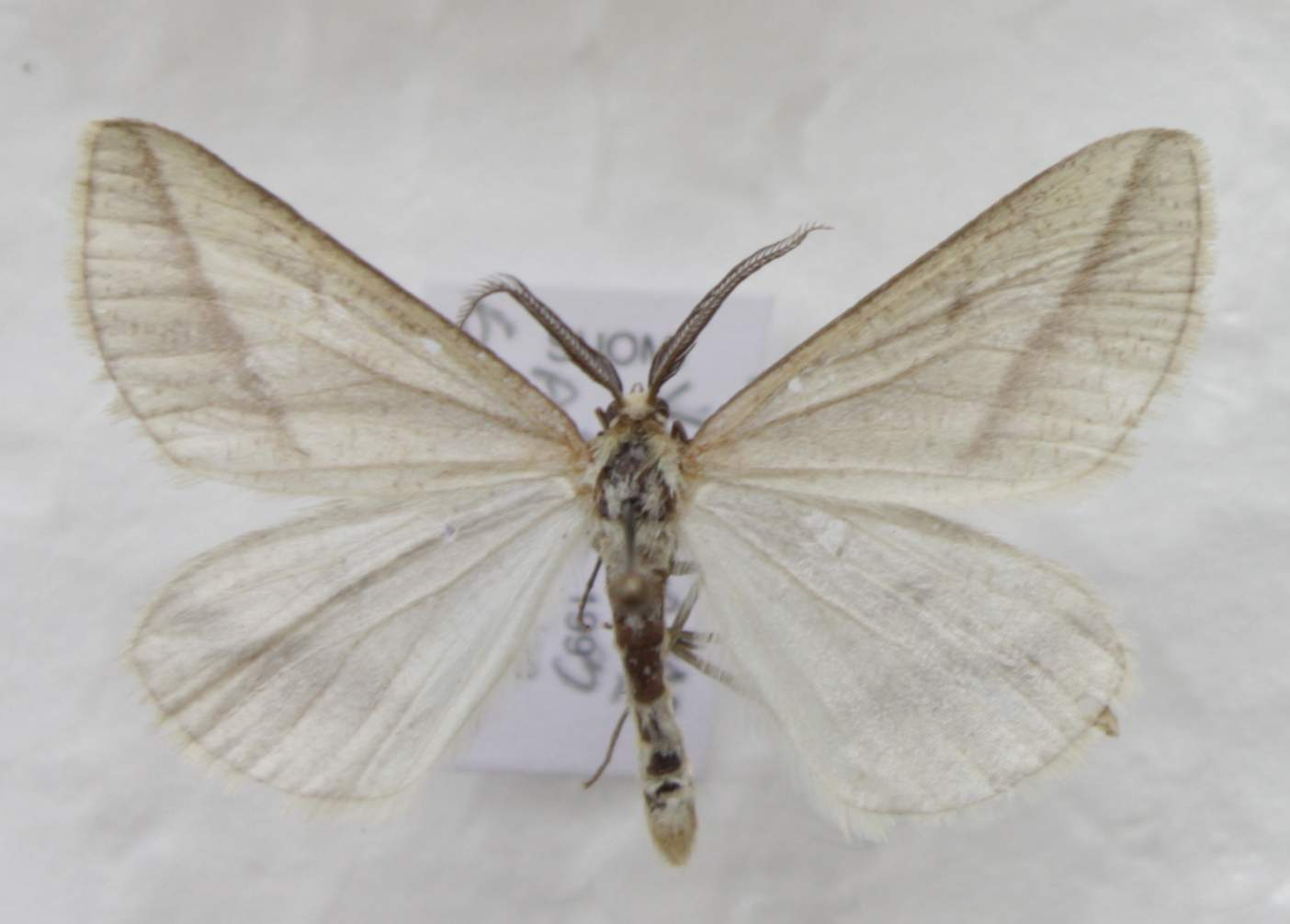
- Aspitates gilvaria

Scientific classification
- Kingdom: Animalia
- Phylum: Arthropoda
- Class: Insecta
- Order: Lepidoptera
- Family: Geometridae
- Tribe: Aspitatini
- Genus: Aspitates; Treitschke, 1825

Synonyms
- Parallela Sodoffsky, 1837; Aspilades Heydenreich, 1846; Aspilata Unger, 1856; Pseudosiona Butler, 1893

= Aspitates =

Genus of moths

Aspitates is a genus of moths in the family Geometridae, native to Eurasia and North America.

== Selected species ==
- Aspitates aberrata (H. Edwards, 1884)
- Aspitates acuminaria (Eversmann, 1851)
- Aspitates albaria
- Aspitates collinaria (Holt-White, 1894)
- Aspitates conspersarius
- Aspitates forbesi
- Aspitates gilvaria – straw belle (Denis & Schiffermüller, 1775)
- Aspitates ochrearia – yellow belle
- Aspitates orciferaria
- Aspitates stschurowskyi (Erschoff, 1874)
- Aspitates taylorae (Butler, 1893)
