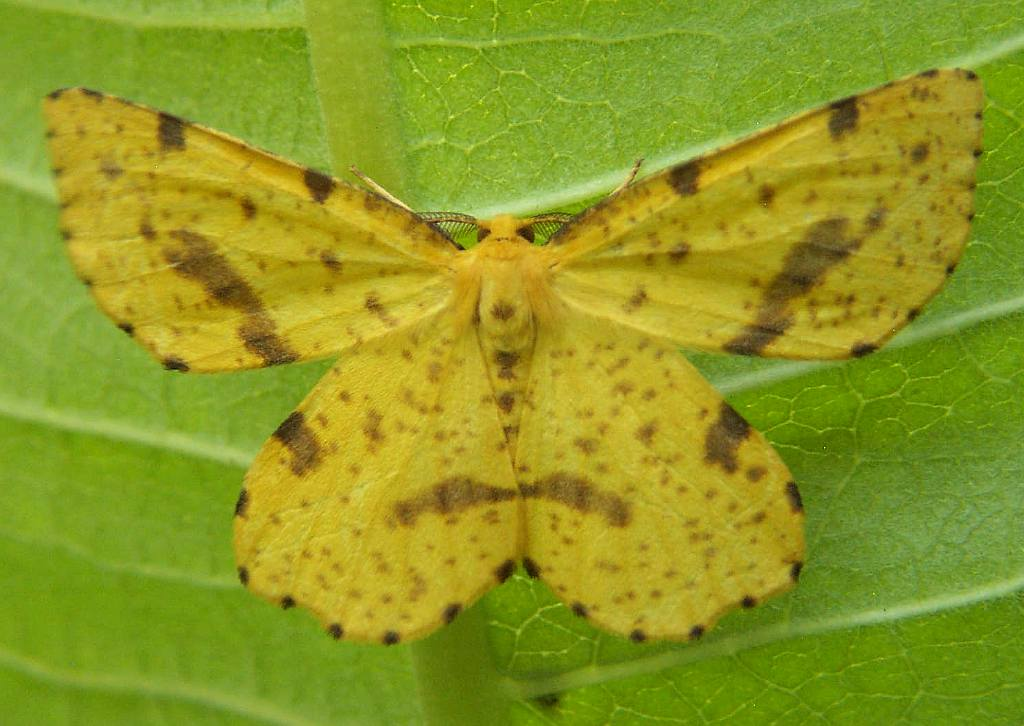

Scientific classification
- Domain: Eukaryota
- Kingdom: Animalia
- Phylum: Arthropoda
- Class: Insecta
- Order: Lepidoptera
- Family: Geometridae
- Genus: Xanthotype
- Species: X. urticaria

Binomial name
- Xanthotype urticaria Swett, 1918

Synonyms
- Xanthotype turbidaria Swett, 1918; Xanthotype vagaria Swett, 1918; Xanthotype watsoni Swett, 1918

= Xanthotype urticaria =

False crocus geometer

Species of insect

Xanthotype urticaria, the false crocus geometer, is a North American moth in the family Geometridae.

== Description ==
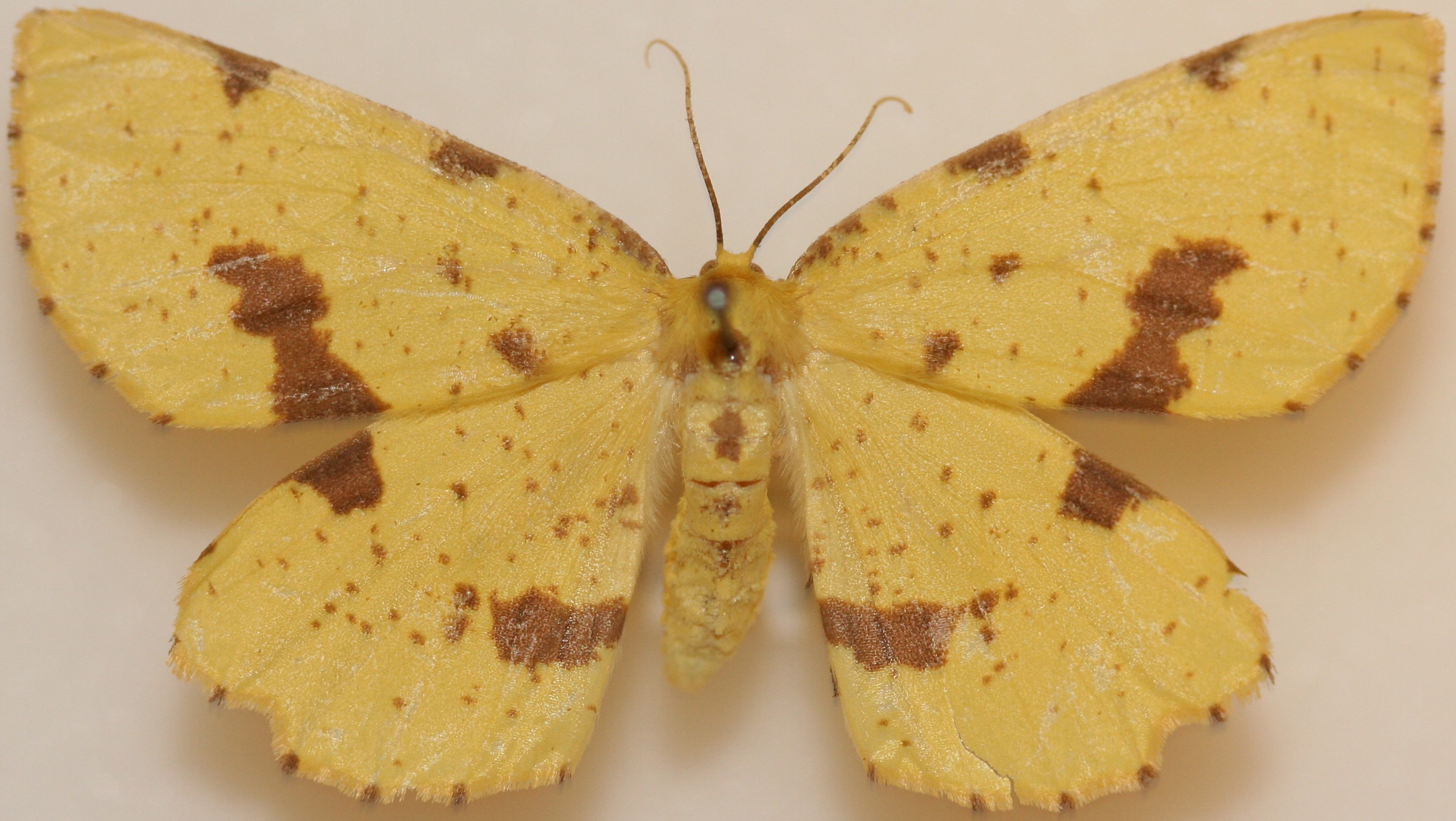
mounted specimen

The wings are bright yellow with many brownish spots and blotches. Males have more of these spots than females. The wingspan measures 3–4 cm.

== Similar species ==
Similar species in the false crocus geometer's range include the crocus geometer (Xanthotype sospeta) and the rufous geometer (Xanthotype rufaria).

The crocus geometer is larger, is pale yellow, and has little or no brown spotting.

The rufous geometer is a deeper yellow and has a reddish fringe.

== Flight ==
This moth is on the wing from May to November.

== Host plants ==
Here is a list of host plants used by the false crocus geometer:

- Red osier dogwood, Cornus sericea
- Ground-ivy, Glechoma hederacea
- Catnip, Nepeta sp.
- Rhodora, Rhododendron canadense
- Goldenrods, Solidago sp.
