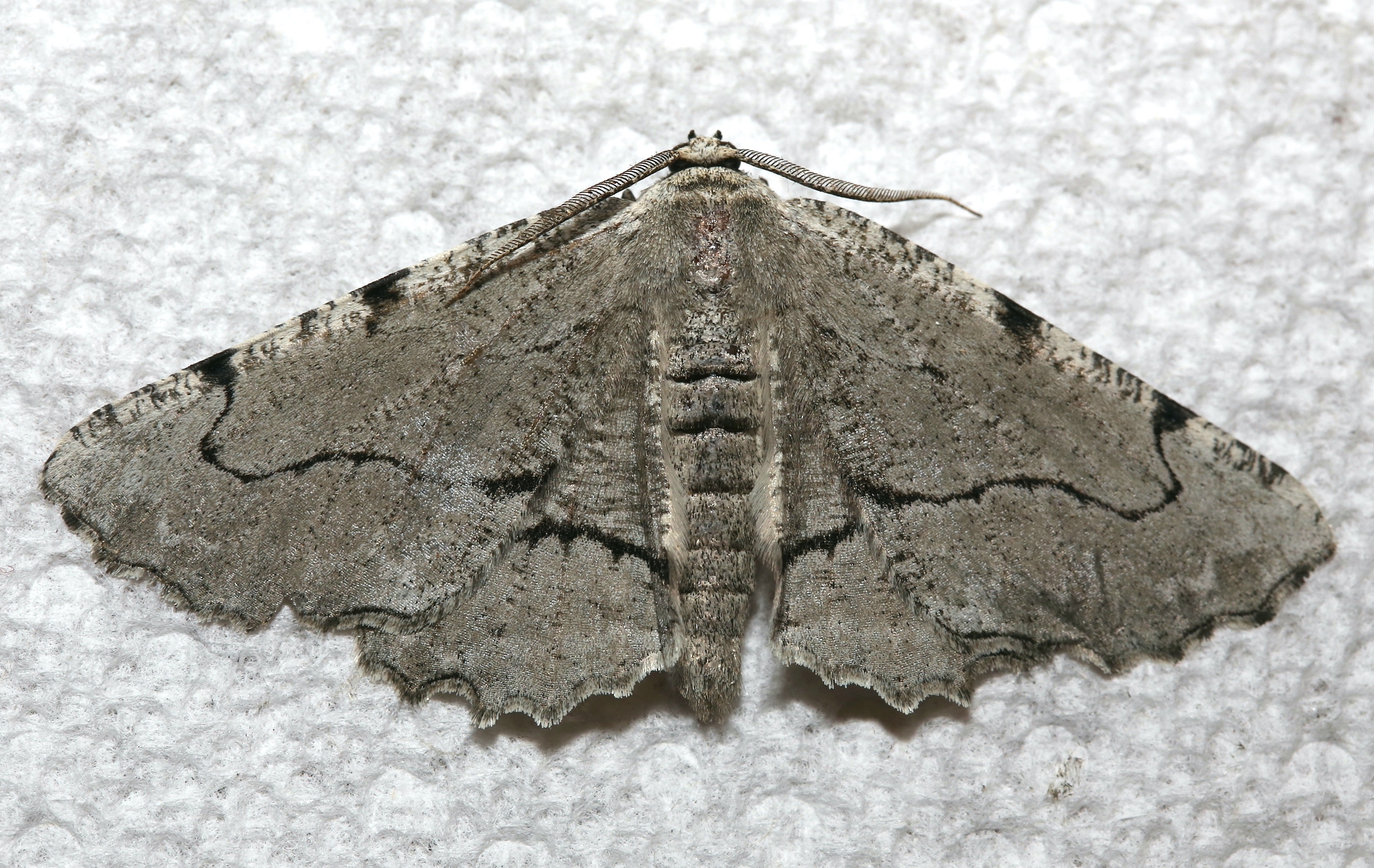

Scientific classification
- Kingdom: Animalia
- Phylum: Arthropoda
- Clade: Pancrustacea
- Class: Insecta
- Order: Lepidoptera
- Family: Geometridae
- Tribe: Angeronini
- Genus: Lytrosis
- Species: L. permagnaria

Binomial name
- Lytrosis permagnaria (Packard, 1876)

= Lytrosis permagnaria =

Species of moth

Lytrosis permagnaria is a species of geometrid moth in the family Geometridae. It is found in North America.
