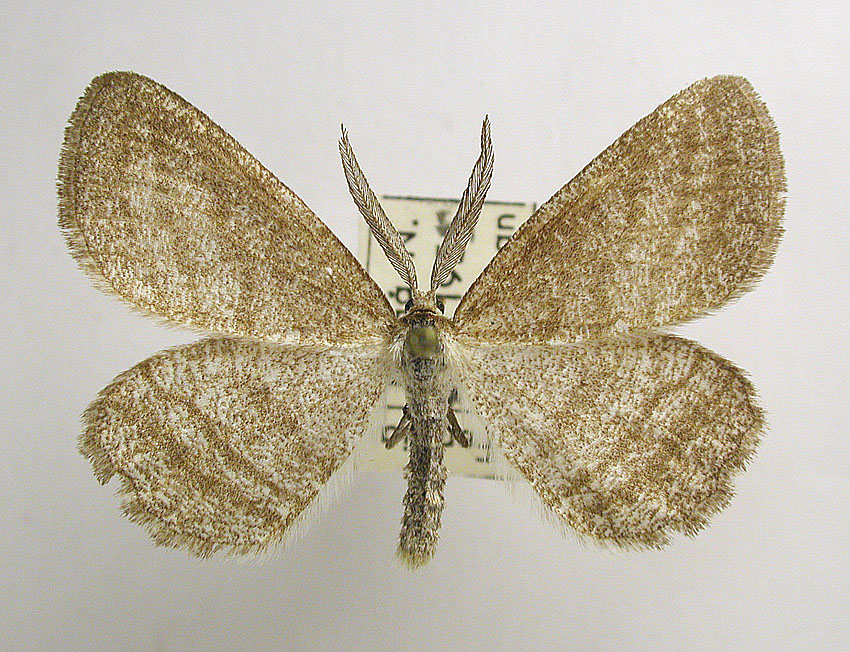
- Perconia strigillaria

Scientific classification
- Kingdom: Animalia
- Phylum: Arthropoda
- Clade: Pancrustacea
- Class: Insecta
- Order: Lepidoptera
- Family: Geometridae
- Tribe: Aspitatini
- Genus: Perconia; Hübner, [1823]

= Perconia =

Genus of moths

Perconia is a genus of moths in the family Geometridae described by Jacob Hübner in 1823.

== Species ==
- Perconia strigillaria (Hübner, 1787) – grass wave
- Perconia baeticaria (Staudinger, 1871)
