= Lytrosis sinuosa =

Scientific classification
- Kingdom: Animalia
- Phylum: Arthropoda
- Class: Insecta
- Order: Lepidoptera
- Family: Geometridae
- Tribe: Angeronini
- Genus: Lytrosis
- Species: L. sinuosa

Binomial name
- Lytrosis sinuosa Rindge, 1971

Species of moth

Lytrosis sinuosa, the sinuous lytrosis moth, is a species of geometrid moth in the family Geometridae. It is found in eastern United States, as far north as New Jersey, as far south as northern Florida and as far west as Mississippi. Moths grow to be 24 to 29 mm long with females being larger than males.

The MONA or Hodges number for Lytrosis sinuosa is 6721.
