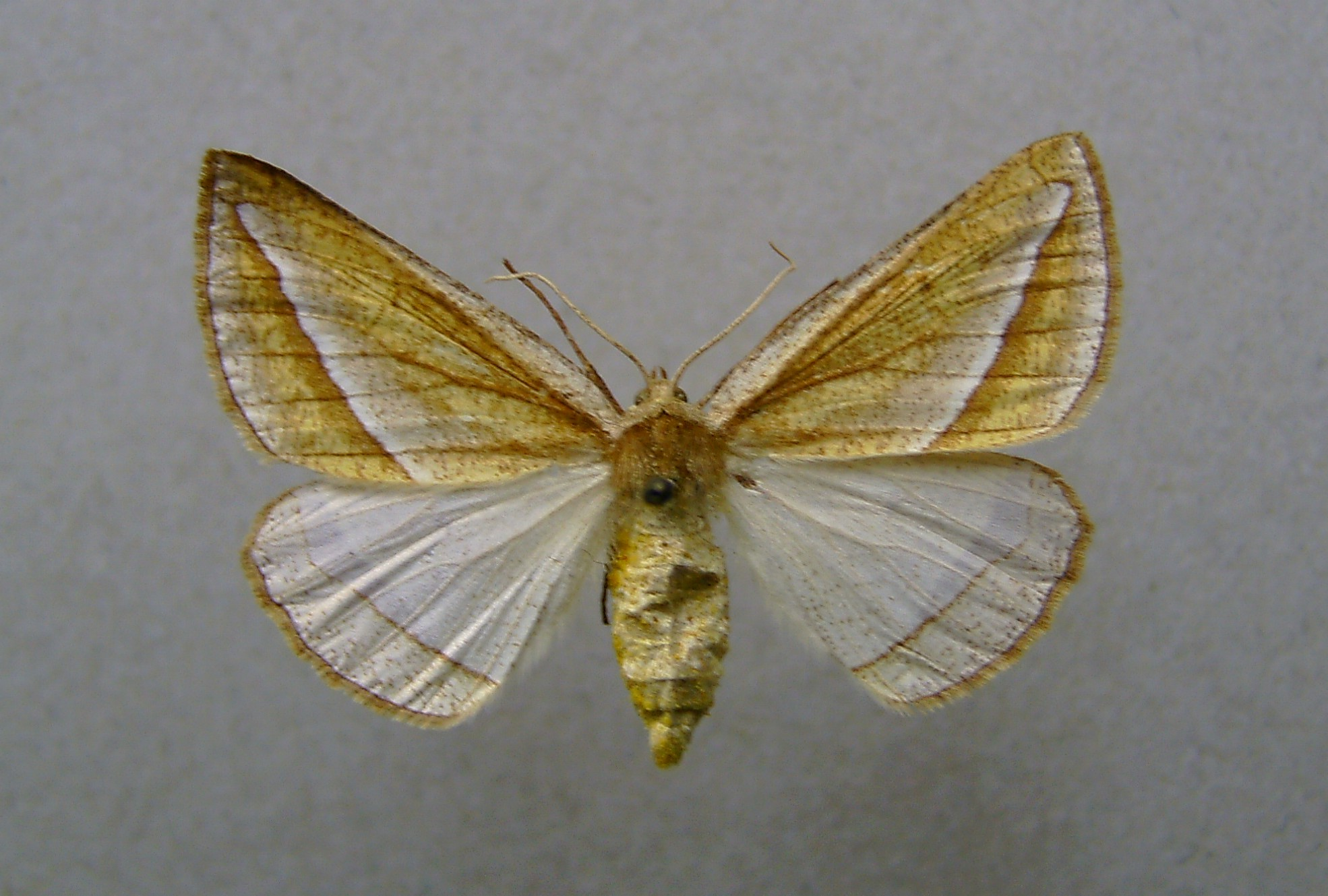
- Female
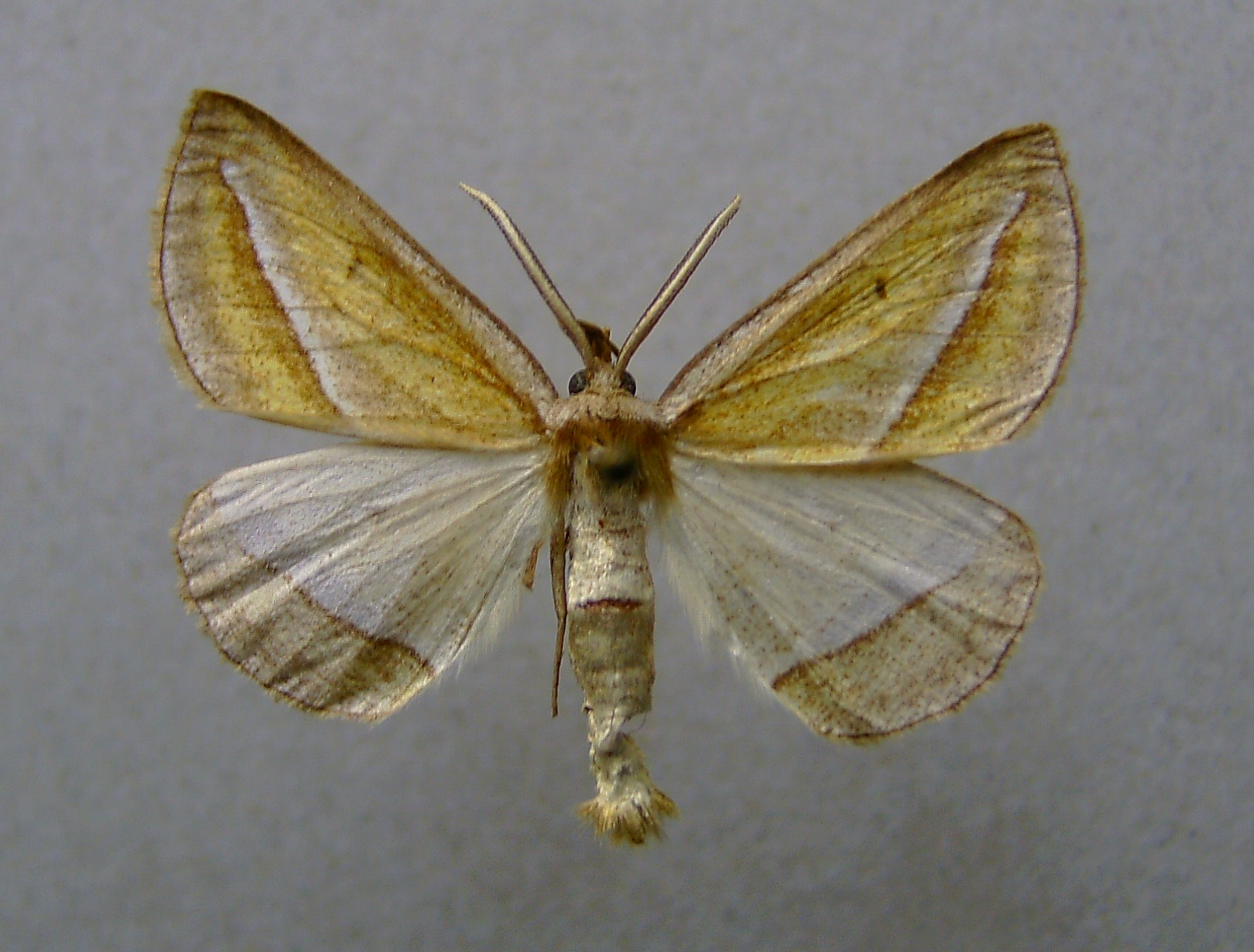
- Male

Scientific classification
- Kingdom: Animalia
- Phylum: Arthropoda
- Clade: Pancrustacea
- Class: Insecta
- Order: Lepidoptera
- Family: Geometridae
- Tribe: Aspitatini
- Genus: Chariaspilates; Wehrli, 1953
- Species: C. formosaria

Binomial name
- Chariaspilates formosaria (Eversmann, 1837)

Synonyms
- Aspilates formosaria Eversmann, 1837; Aspilates andriana Dannehl, 1921; Chariaspilates pannonicus Vojnits, 1977

= Chariaspilates =

Genus of moths

Chariaspilates is a monotypic genus of moth in the family Geometridae erected by Eugen Wehrli in 1953. Its only species, Chariaspilates formosaria, was first described by Eduard Friedrich Eversmann in 1837. It is found in swampy areas from Europe to Japan.

The wingspan is 38–43 mm for females and 31–37 mm for males. Adults are on wing primarily in June and July. Sometimes, a second generation may occur, which is known as C. formosaria f. autumnalis. Adults of this generation are on wing in September or October.

The larvae feed on Myrica gale, Lysimachia vulgaris and Caltha palustris. Larvae can be found from August to May of the following year, when pupation takes place.

== Subspecies ==
- Chariaspilates formosaria formosaria
- Chariaspilates formosaria andriana Dannehl, 1921
- Chariaspilates formosaria pannonicus Vojnits, 1977
