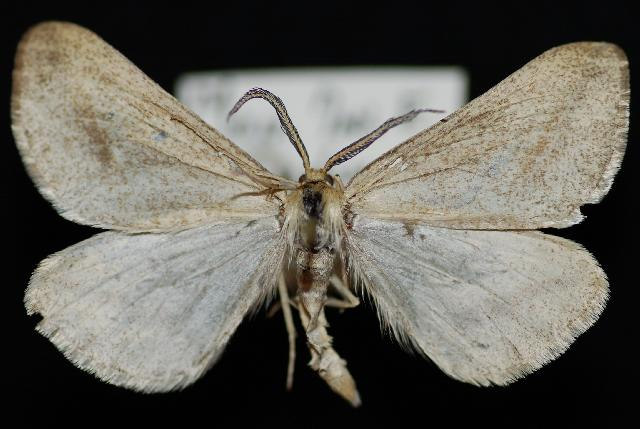

Scientific classification
- Kingdom: Animalia
- Phylum: Arthropoda
- Class: Insecta
- Order: Lepidoptera
- Family: Geometridae
- Genus: Aspitates
- Species: A. aberrata

Binomial name
- Aspitates aberrata (H. Edwards, 1884)

Synonyms
- Phasiane aberrata H. Edwards, 1884; Aspitates orciferaria aberrata

= Aspitates aberrata =

Species of moth

Aspitates aberrata is a species of moth in the family Geometridae that was first described by Henry Edwards in 1884. It is found in North America from northern Minnesota north and west across southern Manitoba to western Alberta and the Peace River area of British Columbia. The habitat consists of open aspen parklands and low elevation grasslands.

The wingspan is 27–36 mm.

There is one generation per year with adults on wing from mid-May to mid-July.

== Subspecies ==
- Aspitates aberrata aberrata (Alberta)
- Aspitates aberrata assiniboiarus Munroe, 1963 (eastern Alberta, Saskatchewan, Manitoba)
