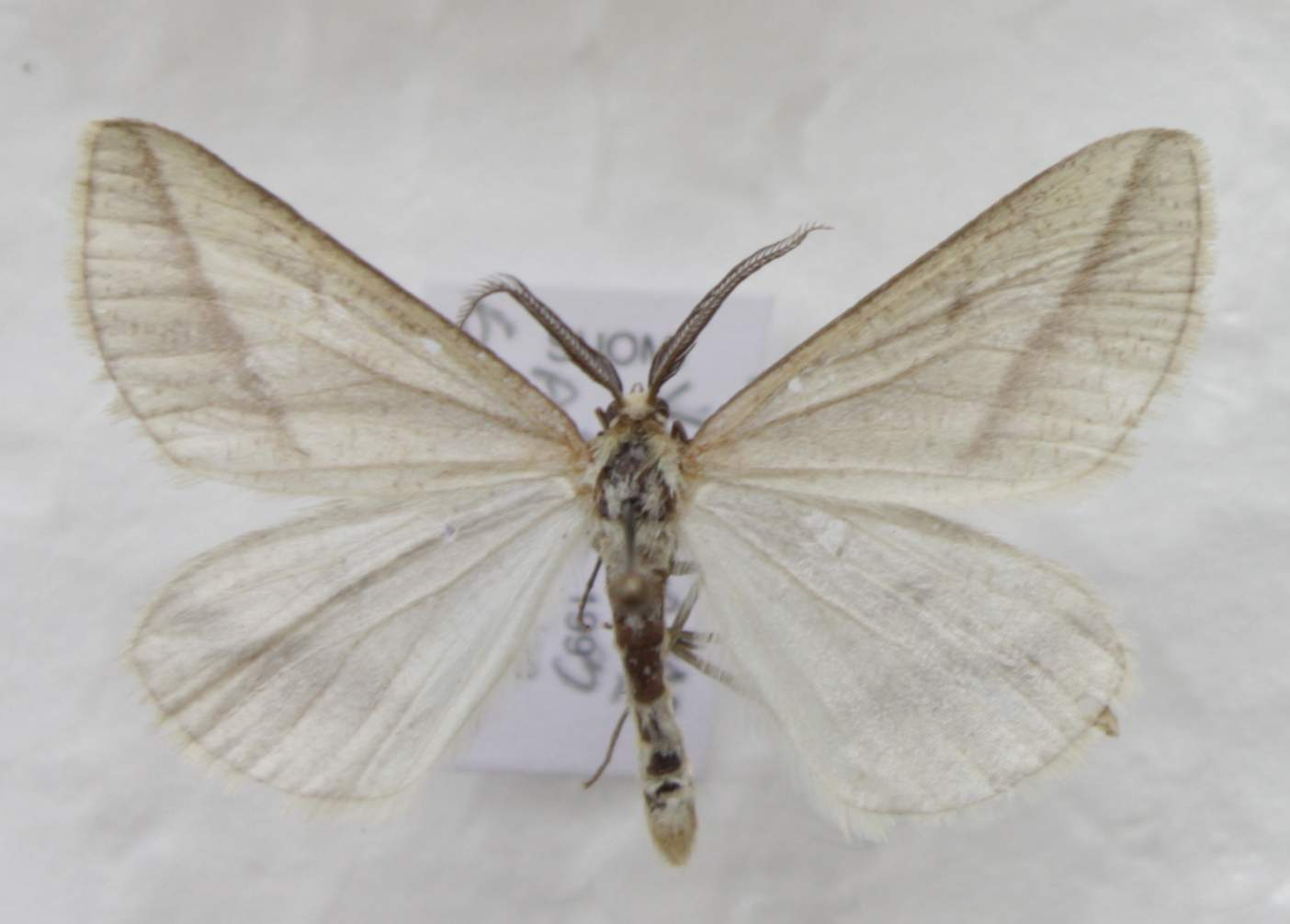

Scientific classification
- Kingdom: Animalia
- Phylum: Arthropoda
- Clade: Pancrustacea
- Class: Insecta
- Order: Lepidoptera
- Family: Geometridae
- Genus: Aspitates
- Species: A. gilvaria

Binomial name
- Aspitates gilvaria (Denis & Schiffermüller, 1775)

Synonyms
- Geometra gilvaria Denis & Schiffermuller, 1775

= Aspitates gilvaria =

Species of moth

Aspitates gilvaria, the straw belle, is a moth of the family Geometridae. The species was first described by Michael Denis and Ignaz Schiffermüller in 1775. It is found from Europe to the eastern part of the Palearctic realm. The main habitats are warm slopes, heathlands, fields and abandoned quarries. In the mountains, the species rises to heights of 1000 meters. Adults are on wing from July to August.

== Description ==
The wingspan is 25–30 mm. The graduated buff coloured forewing has a red or brown diagonal slash from the wing tip to the inside edge. The hindwings are white with a faint diagonal grey streak and a dot on the upper surface. The male has combed antennae. The female is more mottled than the male and has less combed antennae. The egg initially has a light green colour, which changes from reddish yellow to grey just before the caterpillars hatch. The pole and egg base are orange. The surface is covered with about 50 longitudinal ribs. The micropyle rosette is ten to eleven-leaves and surrounded by a large-mesh network. The larva is ochreous grey, with a blackish, ochreous-edged dorsal line and various other fine darker and paler longitudinal lines.

== Diet ==
The larvae feed on various herbaceous plants, including Potentilla, Thymus, Andromeda polifolia and possibly Empetrum nigrum, Rubus chamaemorus and Vaccinium uliginosum.

== Subspecies ==
- Aspitates gilvaria gilvaria
- Aspitates gilvaria fenica (Fuchs, 1899) Finland and the Baltic states
- Aspitates gilvaria orientaria (Alphéraky, 1892) Caucasus, Thian Shan, Sajan and Amdo districts with little or no dark irroration.
- Aspitates gilvaria burrenensis Cockayne, 1951

darker than the nominate subspecies with a longer hindwing stripe - found in the Burren, Ireland

== Similar species ==
- Aspitates ochrearia differs by an additional thin grey inner transverse line on the front wing upperside.

== Gallery ==
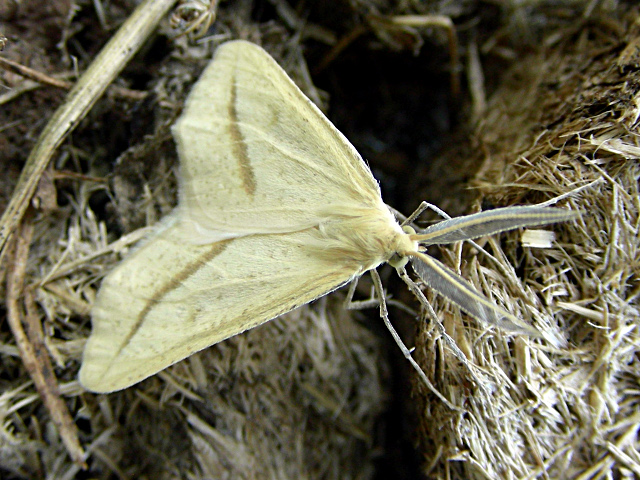

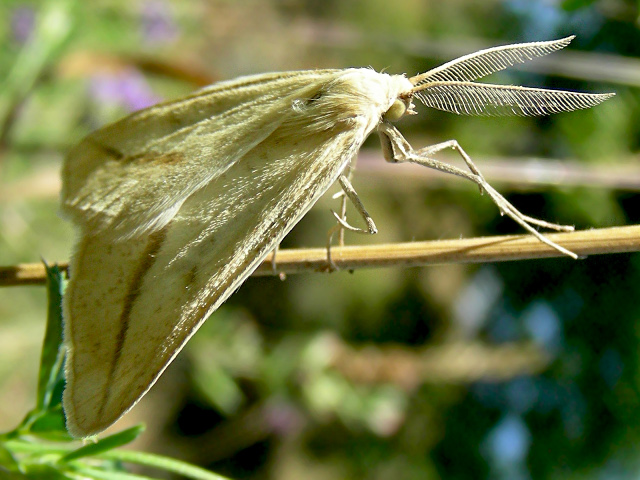

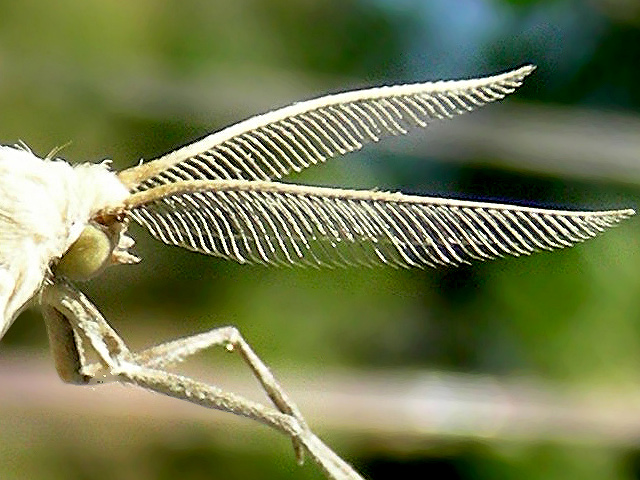
Antennae
