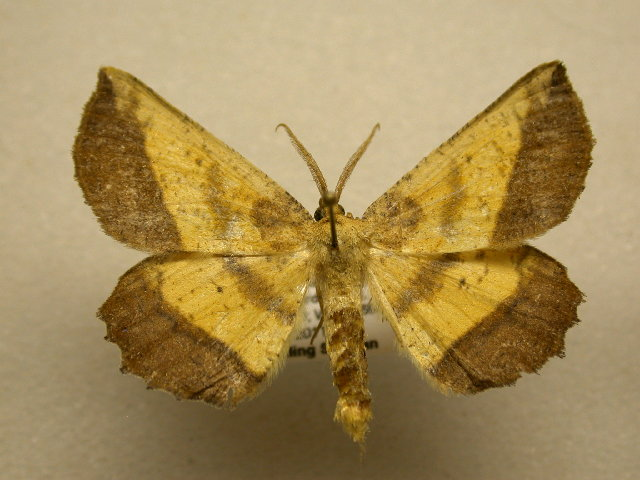

Scientific classification
- Kingdom: Animalia
- Phylum: Arthropoda
- Class: Insecta
- Order: Lepidoptera
- Family: Geometridae
- Genus: Euchlaena
- Species: E. serrata

Binomial name
- Euchlaena serrata (Drury, 1770)

Synonyms
- Phalaena serrata Drury, 1770; Ennomos concisaria Walker, 1866

= Euchlaena serrata =

Species of moth

Euchlaena serrata, the saw-wing moth, is a species of moth of the family Geometridae. It is found in eastern North America.

The wingspan is 40 to 47 millimetres (1.6 to 1.9 in). Adults are on wing from April to August.

The larvae feed on Pyrus, Malus, Acer and Vaccinium species.
