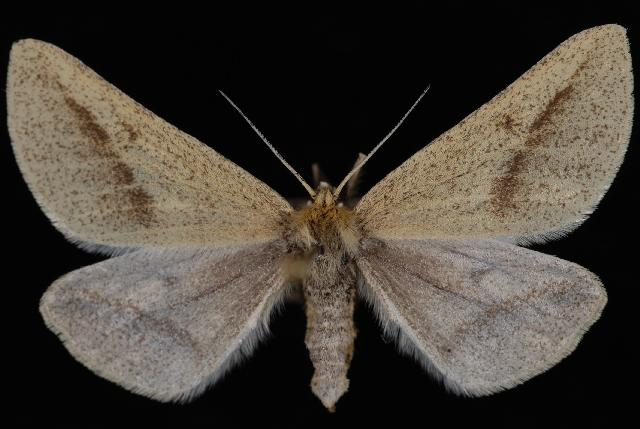

Scientific classification
- Domain: Eukaryota
- Kingdom: Animalia
- Phylum: Arthropoda
- Class: Insecta
- Order: Lepidoptera
- Family: Geometridae
- Genus: Aspitates
- Species: A. orciferaria

Binomial name
- Aspitates orciferaria (Walker, 1862)

Synonyms
- Napuca orciferaria Walker, [1863]; Aspilates orciferaria

= Aspitates orciferaria =

Species of moth

Aspitates orciferaria is a moth of the family Geometridae. It is known from the polar region of the Ural Mountains and northern North America.

== Subspecies ==
- Aspitates orciferaria orciferaria
- Aspitates orciferaria baffinensis (Munroe, 1963)
- Aspitates orciferaria churchillensis (Munroe, 1963)
- Aspitates orciferaria occidentalis (Munroe, 1963)
