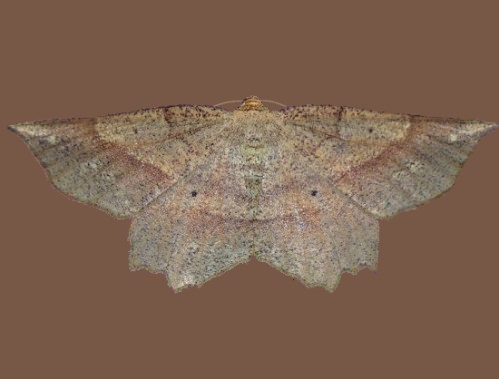

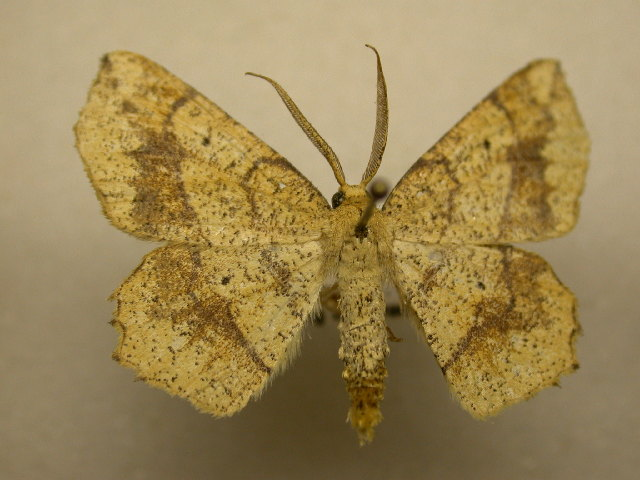

Scientific classification
- Kingdom: Animalia
- Phylum: Arthropoda
- Class: Insecta
- Order: Lepidoptera
- Family: Geometridae
- Genus: Euchlaena
- Species: E. deductaria

Binomial name
- Euchlaena deductaria (Walker, 1860)

Synonyms
- Endropia deductaria Walker, 1860; Hypagyrtis adoptivaria Hubner, [1823]; Geometra pectinaria Denis & Schiffermuller, 1775 (misidentification)

= Euchlaena deductaria =

Species of moth

Euchlaena deductaria, the forked euchlaena moth, is a species of moth of the family Geometridae. It is found in North America, where it has been recorded from Alabama, Arkansas, Florida, Georgia, Kentucky, Maine, Maryland, New York, North Carolina, Ohio, Oklahoma, South Carolina, Tennessee, Texas and West Virginia.

The wingspan is about 42 mm. Adults are on wing from April to August.
