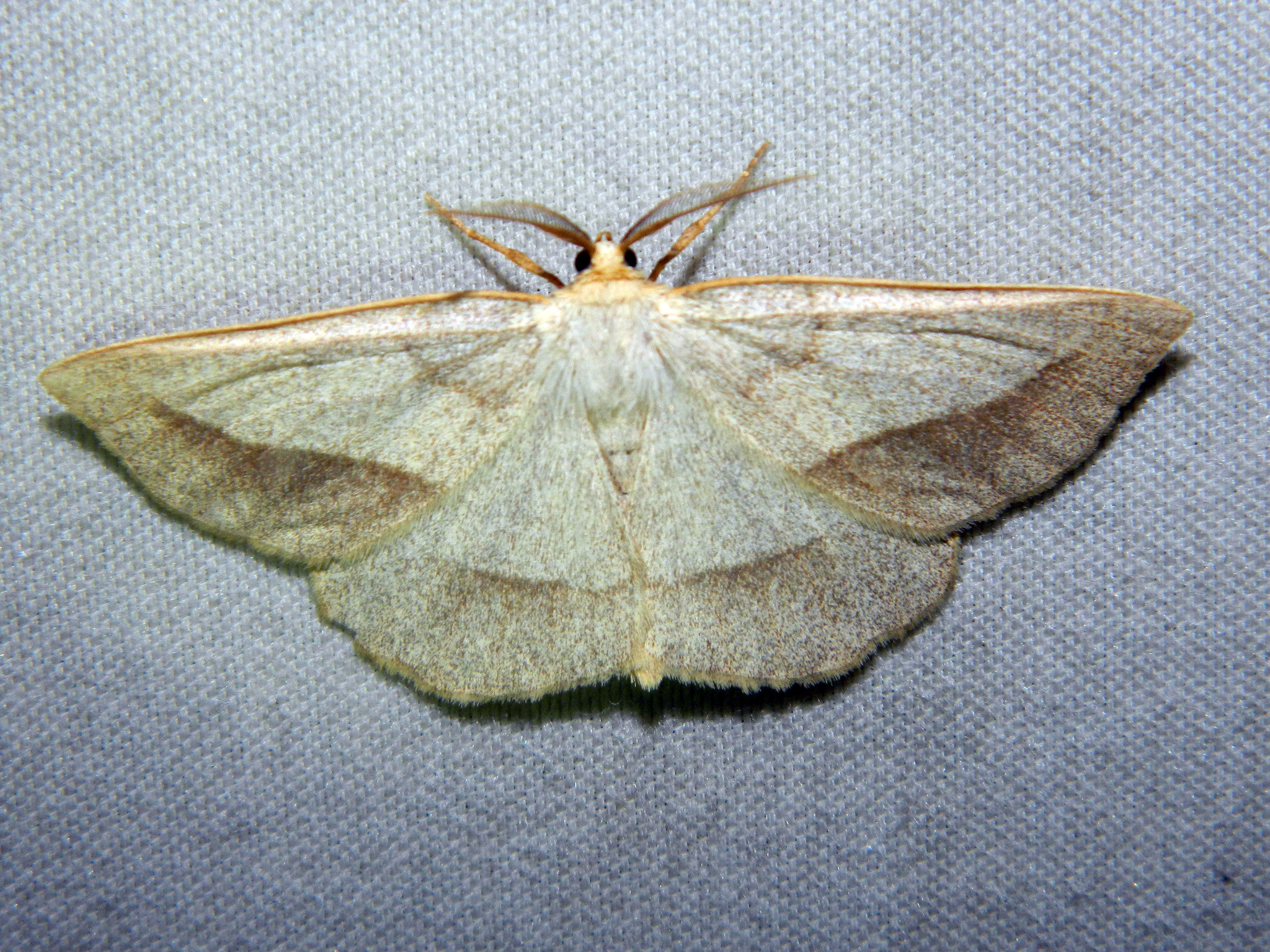

Scientific classification
- Kingdom: Animalia
- Phylum: Arthropoda
- Class: Insecta
- Order: Lepidoptera
- Family: Geometridae
- Genus: Euchlaena
- Species: E. irraria

Binomial name
- Euchlaena irraria Barnes & McDunnough, 1916

= Euchlaena irraria =

Species of moth

Euchlaena irraria, commonly known as the least-marked euchlaena, is a species of moth in the family Geometridae. It was first described by William Barnes and James Halliday McDunnough in 1916 and it is found in North America.
