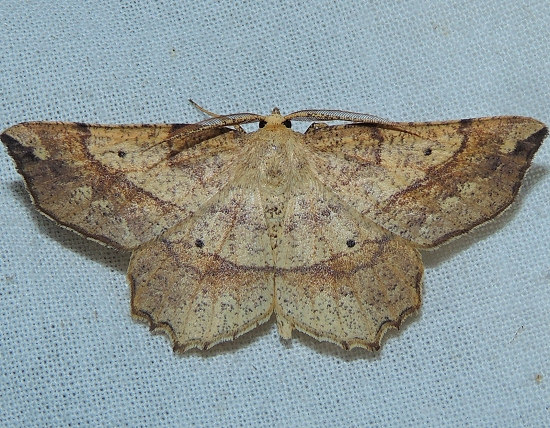

Scientific classification
- Kingdom: Animalia
- Phylum: Arthropoda
- Class: Insecta
- Order: Lepidoptera
- Family: Geometridae
- Genus: Euchlaena
- Species: E. deplanaria

Binomial name
- Euchlaena deplanaria (Walker, 1863)

Synonyms
- Ellopia deplanaria Walker, 1863

= Euchlaena deplanaria =

Species of moth

Euchlaena deplanaria is a species of moth of the family Geometridae. It is found in North America, where it has been recorded from Colorado to Massachusetts and south to Florida and Texas.

The wingspan is about 34 mm. Adults are on wing from February to October.
