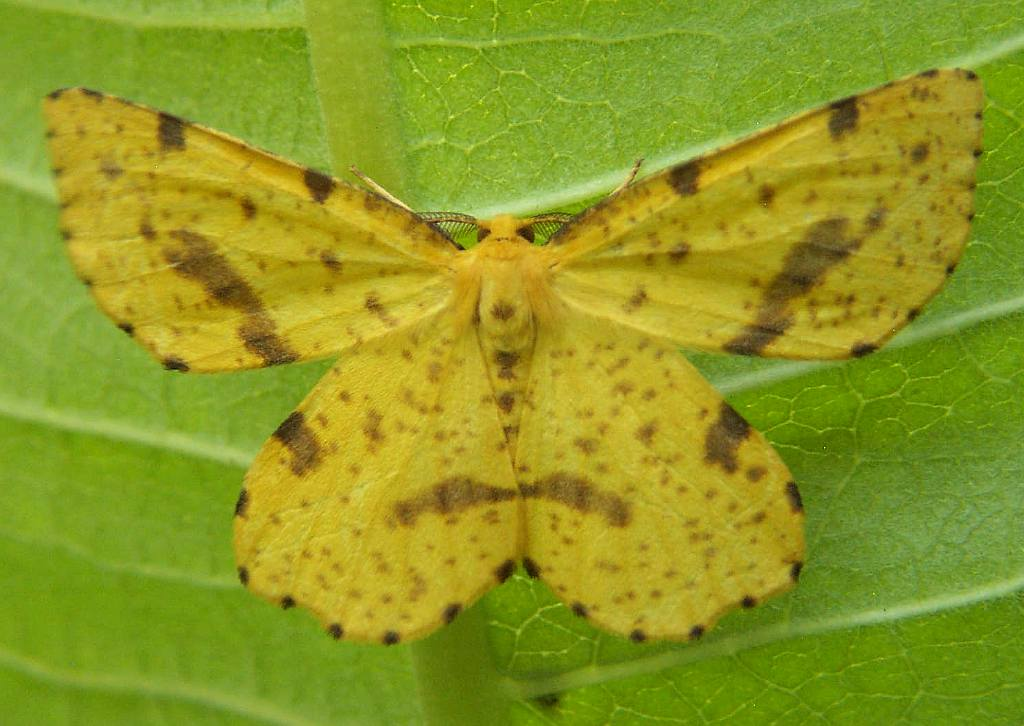
- Xanthotype urticaria

Scientific classification
- Domain: Eukaryota
- Kingdom: Animalia
- Phylum: Arthropoda
- Class: Insecta
- Order: Lepidoptera
- Family: Geometridae
- Tribe: Angeronini
- Genus: Xanthotype; Warren, 1894

= Xanthotype =

Genus of moths

Xanthotype is a genus of moths in the family Geometridae described by Warren in 1894.

== Species ==
Listed alphabetically:

- Xanthotype attenuaria Swett, 1918 – attentive crocus soldier
- Xanthotype barnesi Swett, 1918
- Xanthotype rufaria Swett, 1918 – rufous geometer
- Xanthotype sospeta (Drury, 1773) – crocus geometer
- Xanthotype urticaria Swett, 1918 – false crocus geometer
