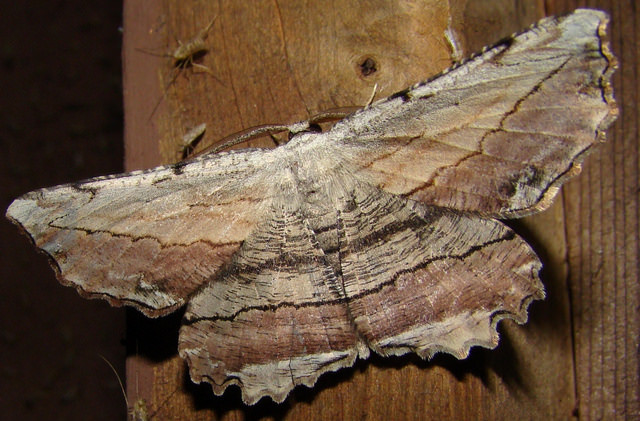

Scientific classification
- Kingdom: Animalia
- Phylum: Arthropoda
- Clade: Pancrustacea
- Class: Insecta
- Order: Lepidoptera
- Family: Geometridae
- Genus: Lytrosis
- Species: L. unitaria

Binomial name
- Lytrosis unitaria (Herrich-Schäffer, 1854)

Synonyms
- Boarmia unitaria Herrich-Schäffer, 1854

= Lytrosis unitaria =

Species of moth

Lytrosis unitaria, the common lytrosis moth, is a species of moth of the family Geometridae. It is found in North America, including Arkansas, Georgia, Iowa, Maine,Massachusetts, New Hampshire, New Jersey, New York, North Carolina, Ohio, Oklahoma, Ontario, Pennsylvania, South Carolina, Tennessee, Texas, Virginia, West Virginia and Wisconsin.

The wingspan is about 50 mm (2.0 in).

The larvae feed on Rosa, Crataegus, Amelanchier, Acer, Quercus and Viburnum species.
