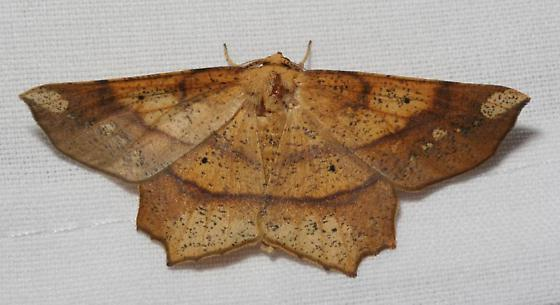

Scientific classification
- Kingdom: Animalia
- Phylum: Arthropoda
- Class: Insecta
- Order: Lepidoptera
- Family: Geometridae
- Genus: Euchlaena
- Species: E. amoenaria

Binomial name
- Euchlaena amoenaria (Guenée, 1857)

Synonyms
- Euchlaena arefactaria (Grote & Robinson, 1867); Euchlaena amoenaria astylusaria

= Euchlaena amoenaria =

Species of moth

Euchlaena amoenaria, the deep yellow euchlaena, is a moth of the family Geometridae. It is found in eastern North America.

The wingspan is 30–50 mm. Adults are on wing from May to September. There are two generations per year.

The larval food plant is unknown, but larvae of other species in the genus feed on the foliage of deciduous trees.
