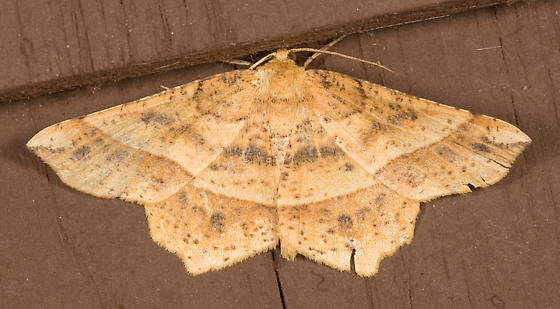

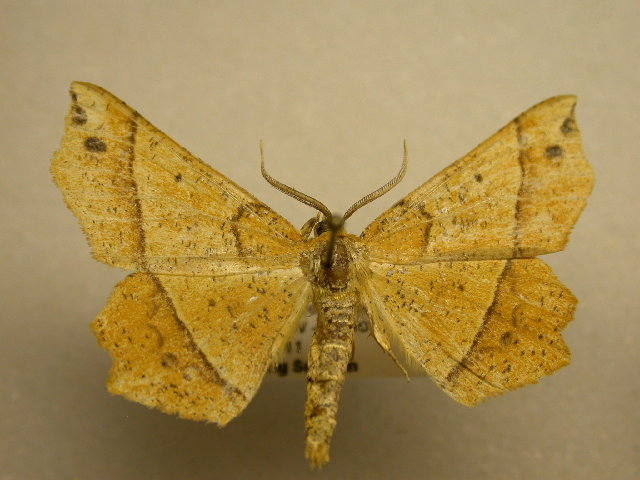

Scientific classification
- Kingdom: Animalia
- Phylum: Arthropoda
- Clade: Pancrustacea
- Class: Insecta
- Order: Lepidoptera
- Family: Geometridae
- Genus: Euchlaena
- Species: E. tigrinaria

Binomial name
- Euchlaena tigrinaria (Guenée, 1857)

Synonyms
- Euchlaena propriaria (Walker, 1860); Euchlaena abnormalis Hulst, 1900; Euchlaena tigrinaria sirenaria

= Euchlaena tigrinaria =

Species of moth

Euchlaena tigrinaria, the mottled euchlaena, is a moth of the family Geometridae. The species was first described by Achille Guenée in 1857. It is found from New Brunswick to Virginia, west to Texas, Utah and Oregon, north to British Columbia.

The wingspan is 33–41 mm. Adults are on wing from April to August in the south and from May or June to July in the north. There is one generation per year.

The larvae feed on Populus tremuloides, Betula papyrifera, Shepherdia canadensis, Cornus sericea, Corylus cornuta, Quercus, Holodiscus discolor, Pinus contorta, Amelanchier alnifolia and Salix species.

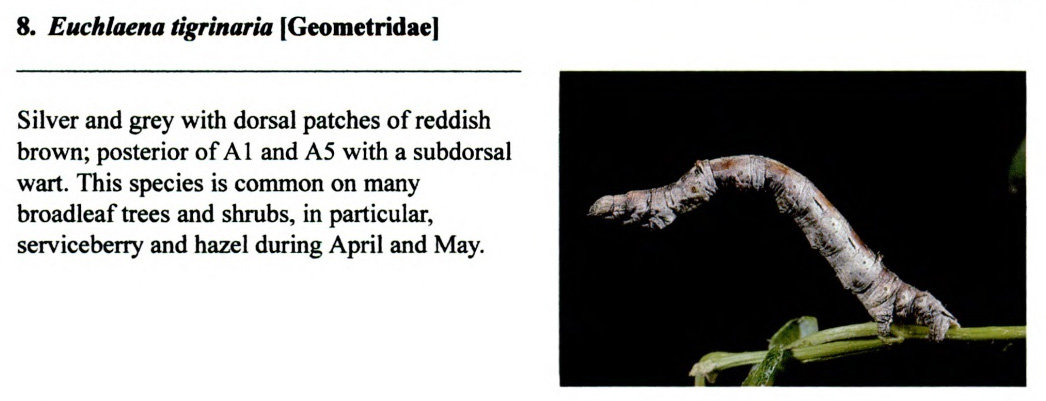
Euchlaena tigrinaria caterpillar
