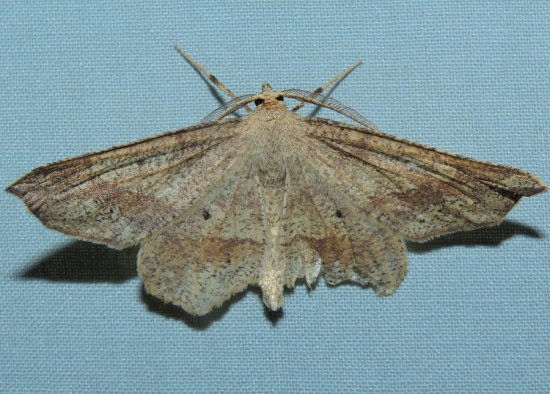

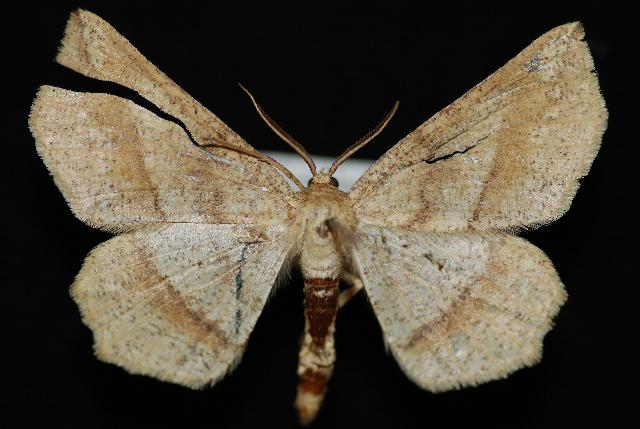

Scientific classification
- Kingdom: Animalia
- Phylum: Arthropoda
- Clade: Pancrustacea
- Class: Insecta
- Order: Lepidoptera
- Family: Geometridae
- Genus: Euchlaena
- Species: E. marginaria

Binomial name
- Euchlaena marginaria (Minot, 1869)

Synonyms
- Caberodes marginaria Minot, 1869; Euchlaena albertanensis Swett, 1917

= Euchlaena marginaria =

Species of moth

Euchlaena marginaria, the ochre euchlaena moth, is a moth of the family Geometridae. The species was first described by Charles Sedgwick Minot in 1869.

It is found in mixedwood and conifer forests across North America, where it has been recorded from south-central British Columbia and Idaho to Nova Scotia and south to Florida and Missouri. Adults are nocturnal and attracted to white and blacklight.

== Adult ==
The wingspan is about 40 mm. Adults are light to dark brown, with extensive dark speckling. The wings are two-toned with a lighter medial band bordered by a dark postmedial line. The forewings are pointed at the apex and round at the inner margin. The hindwings are scalloped only at the tonal margin. There are small discal spots on each wing. The palpi are distinct and projecting beyond the head. Adults are on wing from May to August.

== Caterpillar ==
The larva, a twig-like inchworm, is dark brown with two wart-like dorsal projections at base of abdomen. There is one generation in the north and two in the southern part of the range.

== Host Plants ==
- Alder Alnus
- Ash Fraxinus
- Basswood
- Birch Betula papyrifera
- Dogwood Cornus
- Elm Ulmus
- Linden tree Tilia
- Meadowsweet Spiraea
- Persimmons Diospyros
- Serviceberry Amelanchier
- Viburnum
- Willow Salix
- Wild Lilac Ceanothus

== Photos and External links ==
- iNaturalist
- Moth Photography Group
- Bug Guide
- Euchlaena marginaria in Louisiana. by Vernon Antoine Brou Jr.
