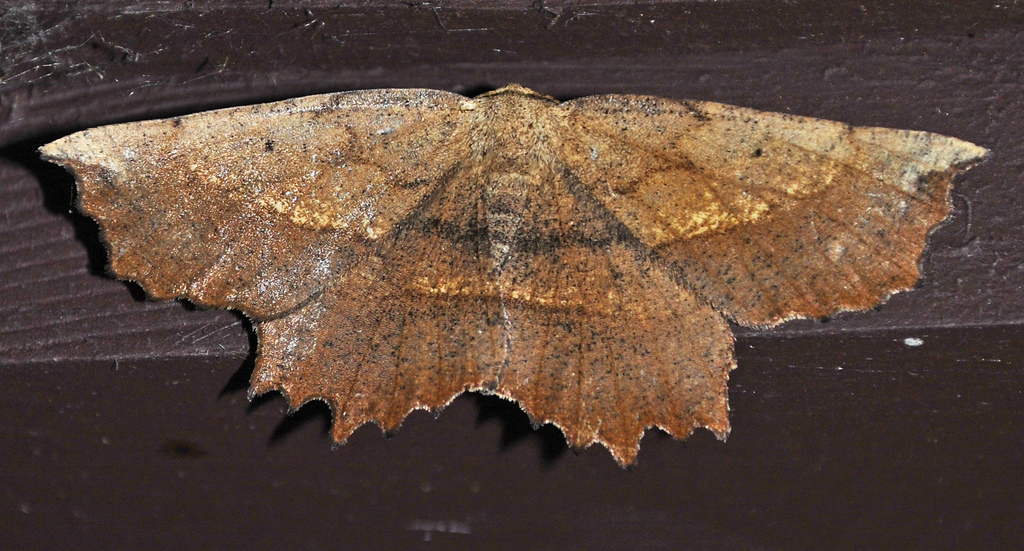
- Euchlaena muzaria

Scientific classification
- Kingdom: Animalia
- Phylum: Arthropoda
- Clade: Pancrustacea
- Class: Insecta
- Order: Lepidoptera
- Family: Geometridae
- Subfamily: Ennominae
- Tribe: Angeronini
- Genus: Euchlaena; Hübner, 1823

= Euchlaena =

Genus of moths

Euchlaena is a genus of moths in the family Geometridae erected by Jacob Hübner in 1823.

== Species ==
- Euchlaena amoenaria (Guenée, 1857) – deep yellow euchlaena moth
- Euchlaena aniliaria (Herrich-Schaffer, 1855)
- Euchlaena deductaria (Walker, 1860) – forked euchlaena moth
- Euchlaena deplanaria (Walker, 1863)
- Euchlaena effecta (Walker, 1860) – effective euchlaena moth
- Euchlaena imitata (Maassen, 1890)
- Euchlaena irraria (Barnes & McDunnough, 1917) – least-marked euchlaena moth
- Euchlaena johnsonaria (Fitch, 1869) – Johnson's euchlaena moth
- Euchlaena madusaria (Walker, 1860) – scrub euchlaena moth
- Euchlaena manubiaria (Hulst, 1886)
- Euchlaena marginaria (Minot, 1869) – ochre euchlaena moth
- Euchlaena milnei McDunnough, 1945
- Euchlaena mollisaria (Hulst, 1886)
- Euchlaena muzaria (Walker, 1860)
- Euchlaena obtusaria (Hübner, 1809–13) – obtuse euchlaena moth
- Euchlaena serrata (Drury, 1770) – saw-wing moth
- Euchlaena silacea Rindge, 1958
- Euchlaena tigrinaria (Guenée, 1857) – mottled euchlaena moth
- Euchlaena undularia (Dyar, 1910)

== Former species ==
- Euchlaena pectinaria (Denis & Schiffermüller, 1775)
