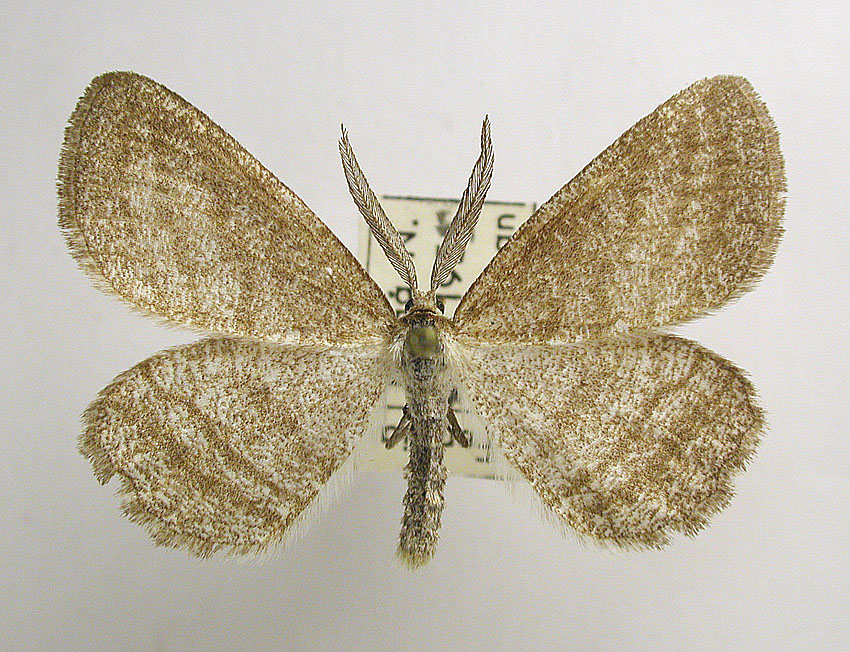

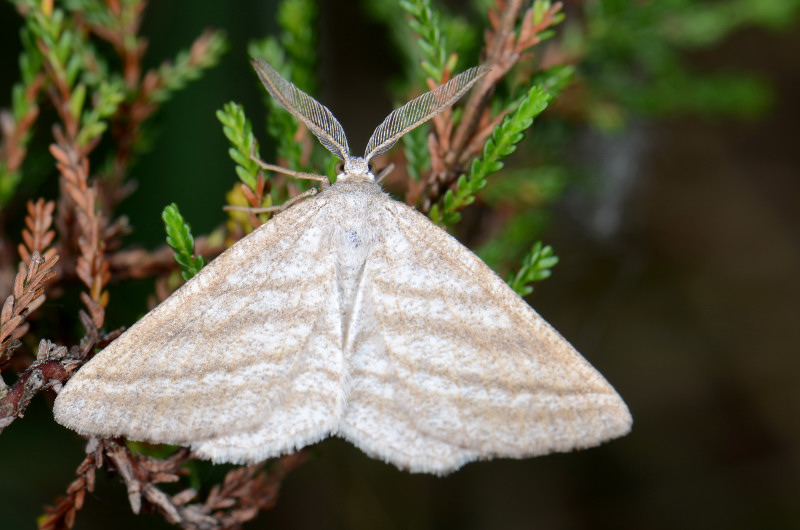

Scientific classification
- Kingdom: Animalia
- Phylum: Arthropoda
- Class: Insecta
- Order: Lepidoptera
- Family: Geometridae
- Genus: Perconia
- Species: P. strigillaria

Binomial name
- Perconia strigillaria (Hübner, 1787)

= Perconia strigillaria =

Species of moth

Perconia strigillaria, the grass wave, is a moth of the family Geometridae. The species was first described by Jacob Hübner in 1787. It can be found in Europe, east to the Urals, Asia Minor and China's Tarbagatai Mountains.

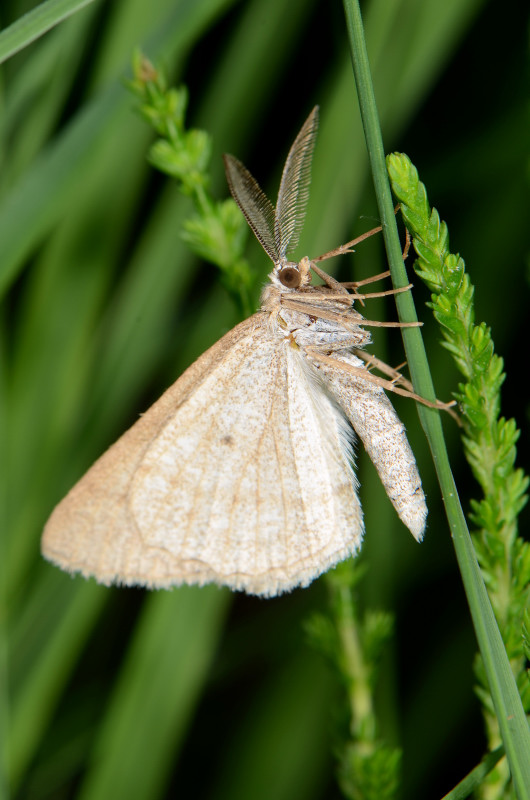

The wingspan is 36–41 mm. The forewing ground colour is white with fuscous irroration. The crosslines are wide The antennae are comb like. "White, with fuscous irroration; all the lines present, usually also a subterminal dark line. Median line (or shade) variable in position and thickness. - ab. herpeticaria Rbr. Antemedian and median lines of wing thick and closely approximated, sometimes confluent into a band. - grisearia Stgr. is a greyer form the white ground-colour nearly suppressed. Frequent in N. Europe, but not very sharply separable from the name-type. Most British examples are intermediate. - cretaria Ev. is a clearer white, weakly marked form from S. E. Russia, sometimes quite markingless."

The moths fly from June to July depending on the location.

The larvae feed on Cytisus scoparius and Calluna, Erica and Ulex species.
