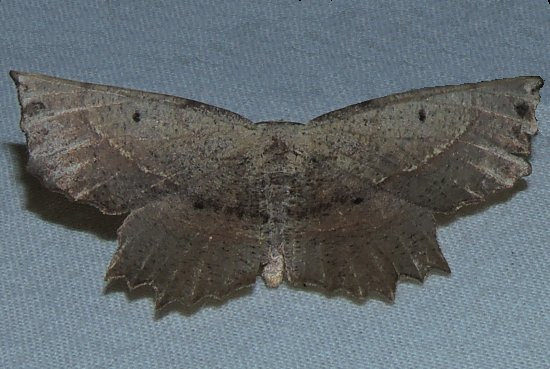

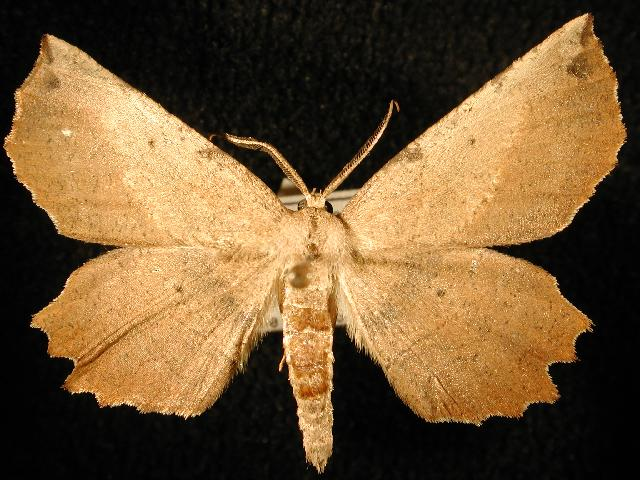

Scientific classification
- Domain: Eukaryota
- Kingdom: Animalia
- Phylum: Arthropoda
- Class: Insecta
- Order: Lepidoptera
- Family: Geometridae
- Genus: Euchlaena
- Species: E. obtusaria

Binomial name
- Euchlaena obtusaria (Hubner, 1813)

Synonyms
- Eutrapela obtusaria Hubner, 1813; Clysia decisaria Walker, 1860; Endropia incisaria Walker, 1866

= Euchlaena obtusaria =

Species of moth

Euchlaena obtusaria, the obtuse euchlaena moth, is a moth of the family Geometridae. The species was first described by Jacob Hübner in 1813. It is found in North America, where it has been recorded from Alberta east to Nova Scotia, south to Florida and Texas. The habitat consists of mixed wood forests.

The wingspan is 27–48 mm. Adults are on wing from April to September.

The larvae feed on Rosa and Impatiens species.
