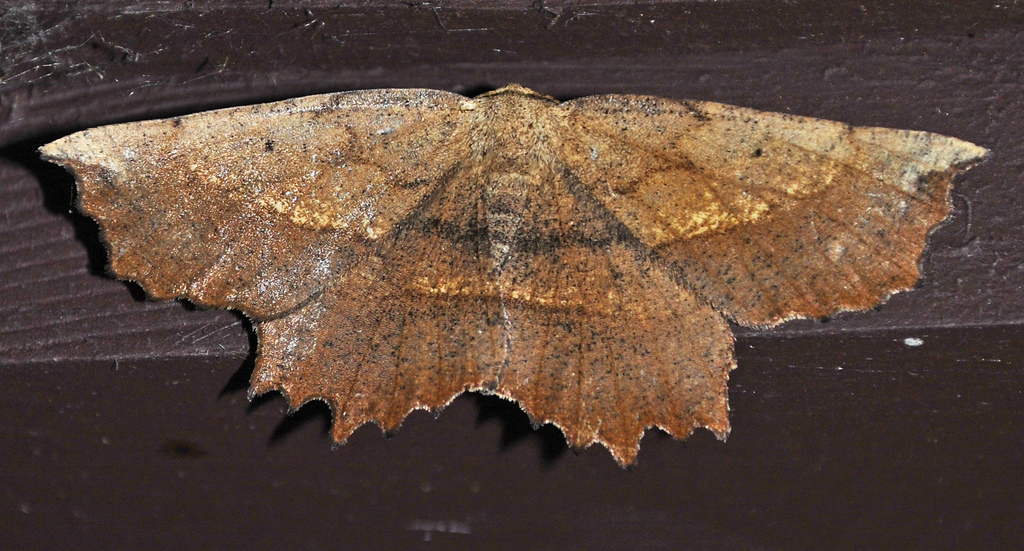

Scientific classification
- Kingdom: Animalia
- Phylum: Arthropoda
- Class: Insecta
- Order: Lepidoptera
- Family: Geometridae
- Genus: Euchlaena
- Species: E. muzaria

Binomial name
- Euchlaena muzaria (Walker, 1860)

Synonyms
- Endropia muzaria Walker 1860

= Euchlaena muzaria =

Species of moth

Euchlaena muzaria, the muzaria euchlaena moth, is a species of moth of the family Geometridae. It is found in North America, where it has been recorded from Florida, Kentucky, Maine, Maryland, Massachusetts, Minnesota, New Brunswick, New Hampshire, New York, North Carolina, Ohio, Ontario, South Carolina and Tennessee.

The wingspan is 27–48 mm. with adults on wing from April to August.

The larvae feed on Prunus serotina and Prunus virginiana.
