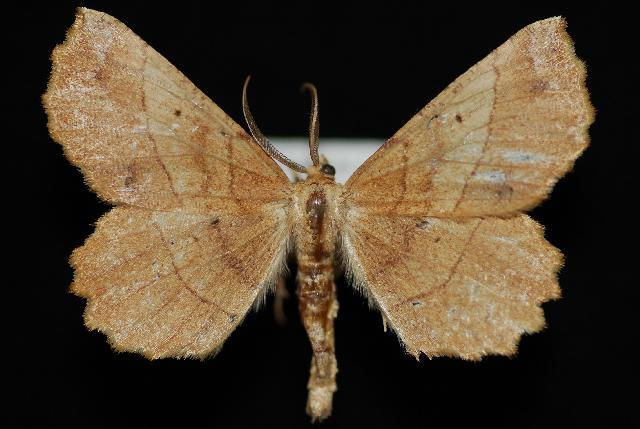

Scientific classification
- Domain: Eukaryota
- Kingdom: Animalia
- Phylum: Arthropoda
- Class: Insecta
- Order: Lepidoptera
- Family: Geometridae
- Genus: Euchlaena
- Species: E. mollisaria

Binomial name
- Euchlaena mollisaria (Hulst, 1886)

Synonyms
- Endropia mollisaria Hulst, 1886; Endropia occantaria Hulst, 1886

= Euchlaena mollisaria =

Species of moth

Euchlaena mollisaria is a species of moth of the family Geometridae. It is found in North America, where it has been recorded from southern California to Colorado, north to Montana and British Columbia.

The wingspan is about 46 mm. The wings are clay fawn, with a lighter median area and with scattered dark fawn striations, as well as a whitish apical spot. Adults are on wing from May to September.
