= Euchlaena effecta =

Scientific classification
- Kingdom: Animalia
- Phylum: Arthropoda
- Class: Insecta
- Order: Lepidoptera
- Family: Geometridae
- Genus: Euchlaena
- Species: E. effecta

Binomial name
- Euchlaena effecta (Walker, 1860)

Synonyms
- Endropia effecta Walker, 1860; Endropia effectaria Walker, 1863; Euchlaena clementina Gumppenberg, 1895

Species of moth

Euchlaena effecta, the effective euchlaena moth, is a species of moth of the family Geometridae. It is found in North America, including New Brunswick, Quebec and Ontario.

The wingspan is 40–47 mm.
