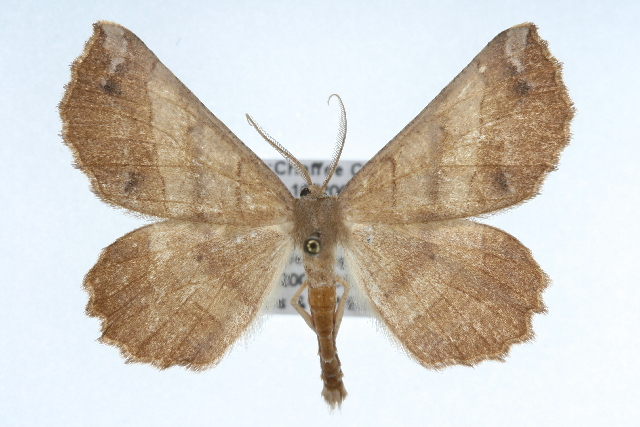

Scientific classification
- Kingdom: Animalia
- Phylum: Arthropoda
- Clade: Pancrustacea
- Class: Insecta
- Order: Lepidoptera
- Family: Geometridae
- Genus: Euchlaena
- Species: E. johnsonaria

Binomial name
- Euchlaena johnsonaria (Fitch, 1870)

Synonyms
- Priocycla johnsonaria Fitch, 1870; Priocycla bilinearia Packard, 1870; Endropia minoraria Hulst, 1886

= Euchlaena johnsonaria =

Species of moth

Euchlaena johnsonaria, or Johnson's euchlaena moth, is a moth of the family Geometridae. The species was first described by Asa Fitch in 1870. It is found in North America, where it has been recorded from southern coastal British Columbia east to Nova Scotia, south to New Jersey, Missouri and Oregon. The habitat consists of deciduous wooded areas.

The wingspan is about 32 mm. Adults are on wing from May to August.

The larvae feed on various deciduous trees and shrubs, including Cornus, Salix, Spiraea, Vaccinium, Ulmus, Fraxinus and Betula species.

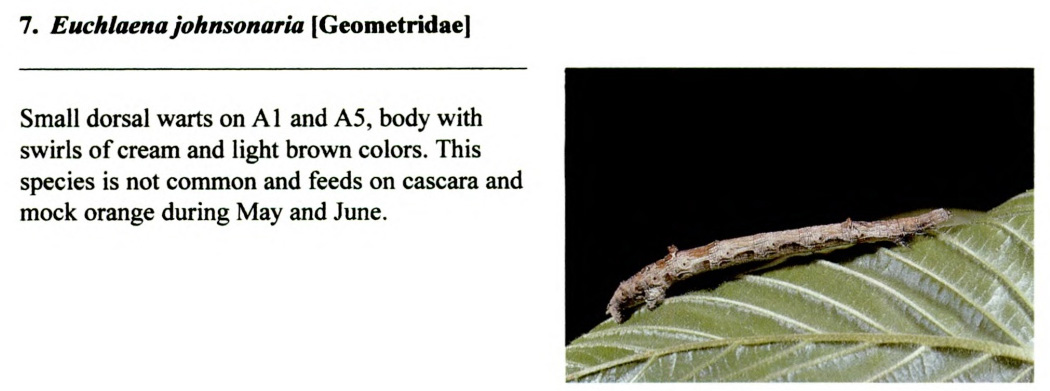
Euchlaena johnsonaria caterpillar

== Subspecies ==
- Euchlaena johnsonaria johnsonaria
- Euchlaena johnsonaria minoraria (Hulst, 1886)
