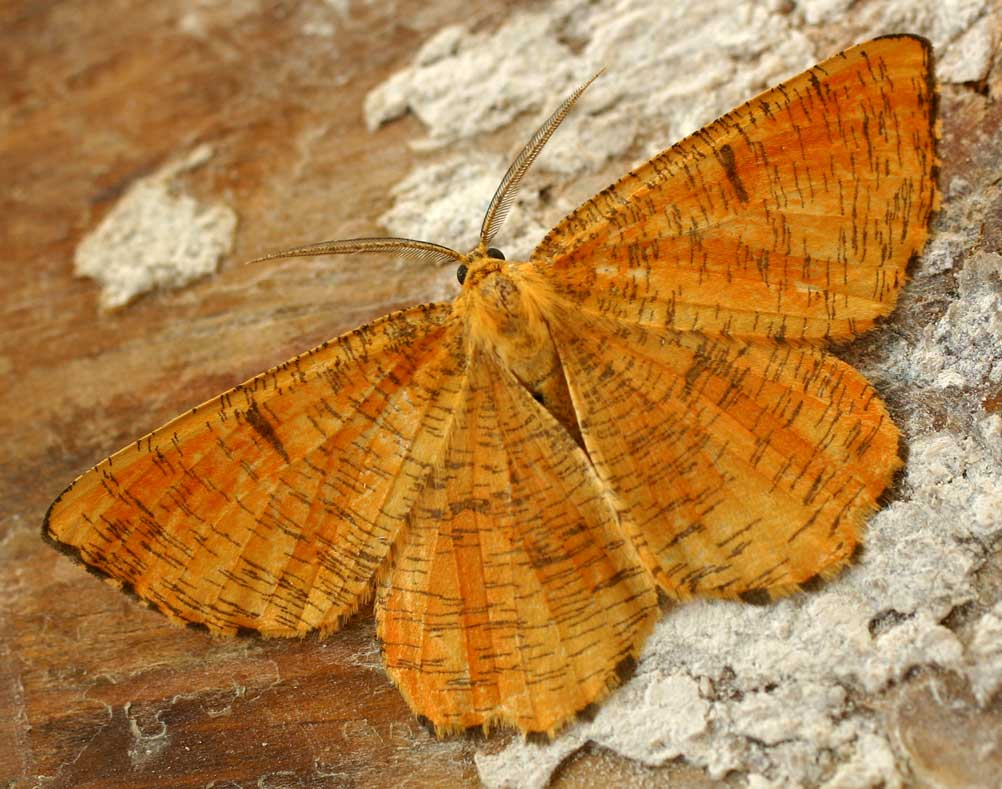

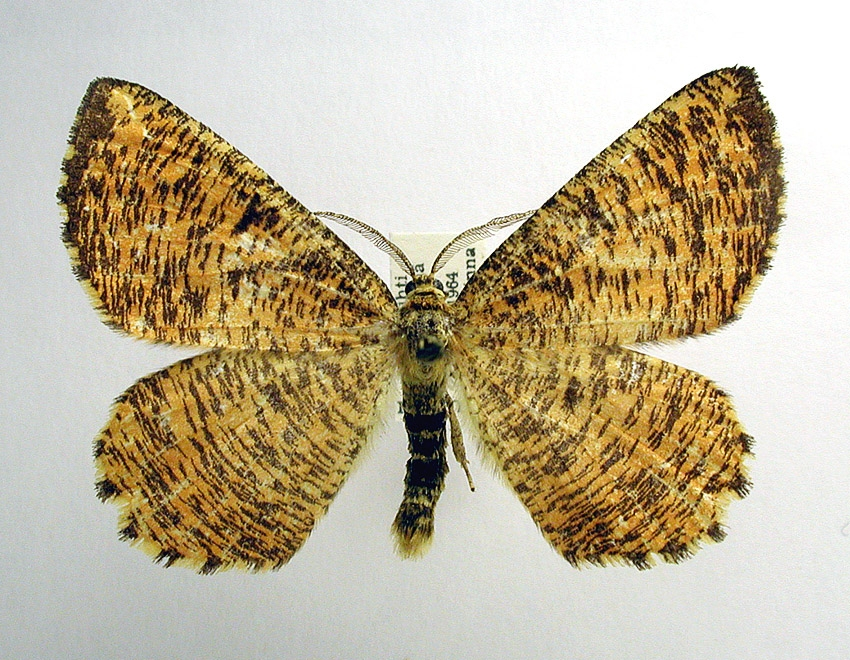
- Mounted

Scientific classification
- Kingdom: Animalia
- Phylum: Arthropoda
- Clade: Pancrustacea
- Class: Insecta
- Order: Lepidoptera
- Family: Geometridae
- Tribe: Angeronini
- Genus: Angerona; Duponchel, 1829
- Species: A. prunaria

Binomial name
- Angerona prunaria Linnaeus, 1758

= Angerona prunaria =

Orange moth

Sole species of Angerona, a geometer moth genus

Angerona is a monotypic genus of moth in the family Geometridae erected by Philogène Auguste Joseph Duponchel in 1829. Its only species, Angerona prunaria, the orange moth, was first described by Carl Linnaeus in his 1758 10th edition of Systema Naturae.

== Description ==
Angerona prunaria is a relatively large and prominent representatives of the geometer moths. It can reach a wingspan of 35–45 mm, rarely up to 56 mm. As in most Lepidoptera, the males are usually slightly smaller than the females.

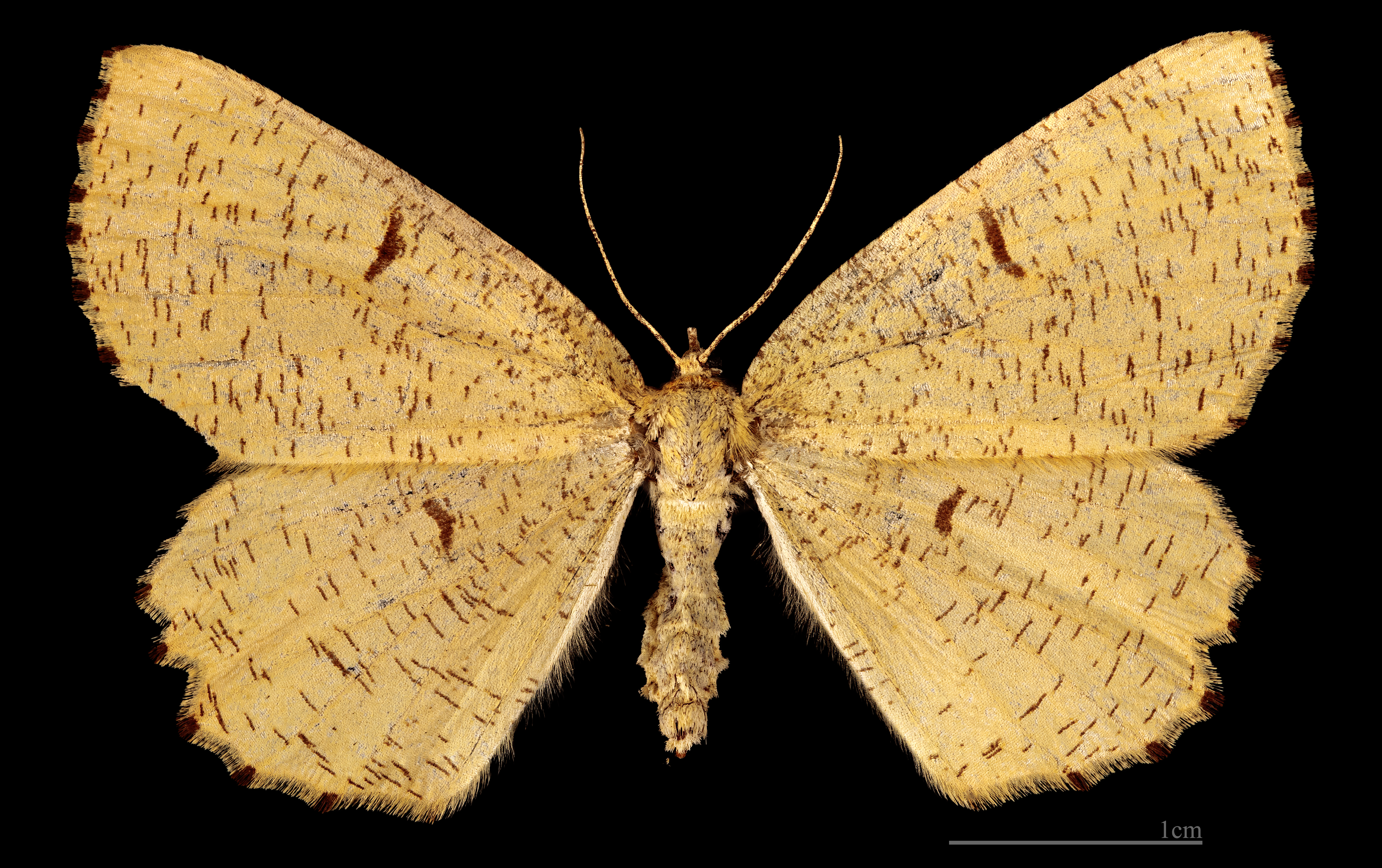
Angerona prunaria prunaria ♀

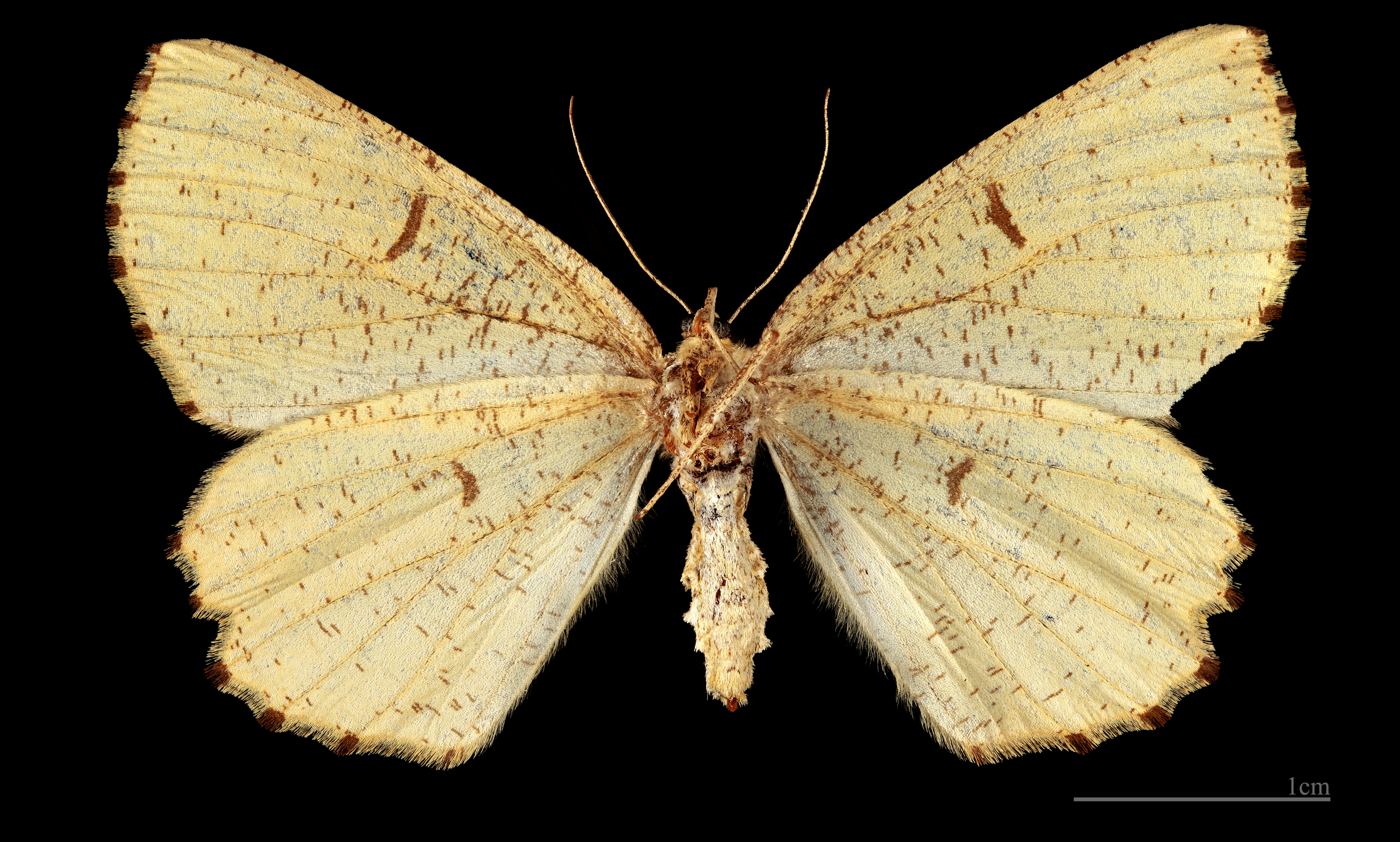
Angerona prunaria prunaria ♀ △

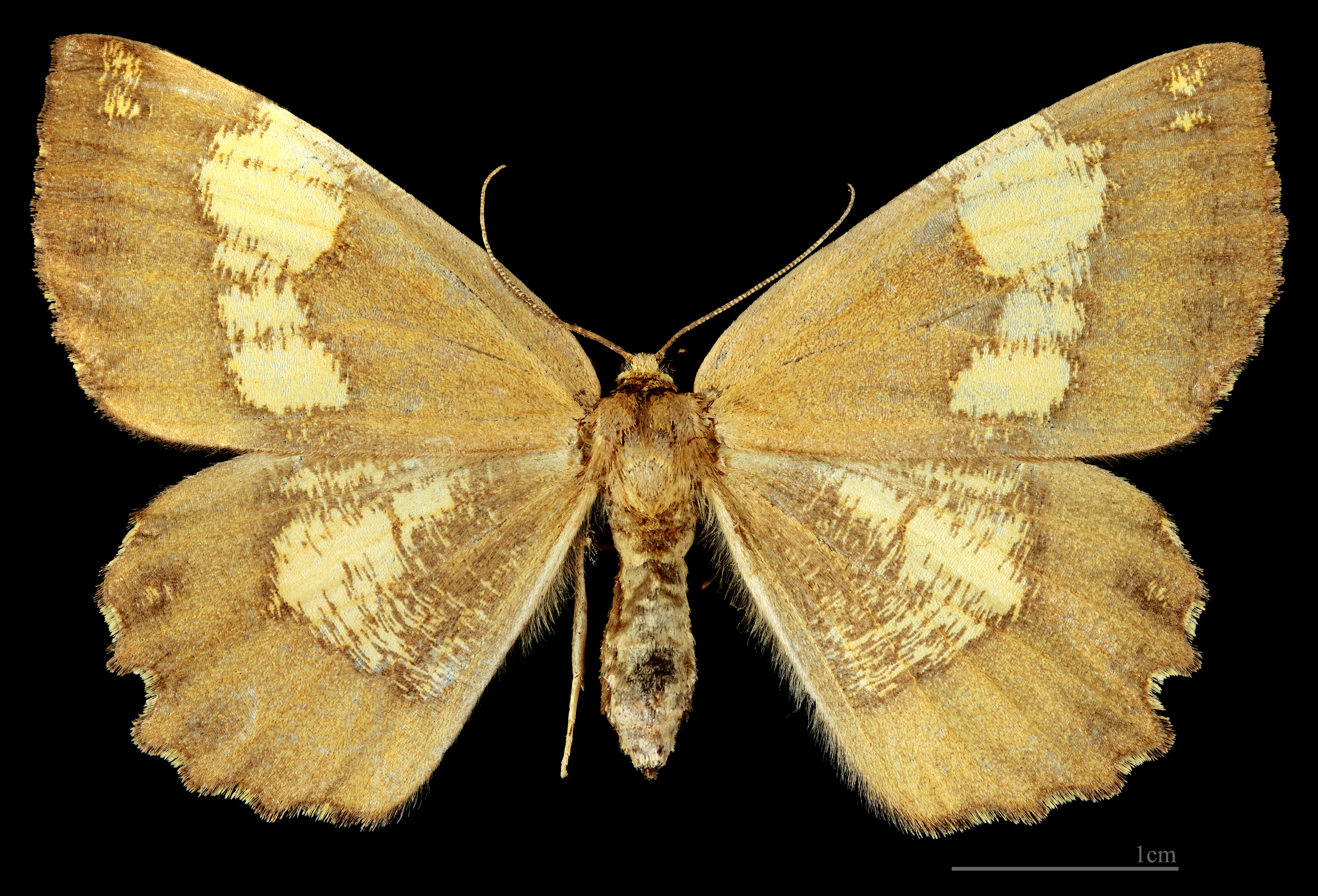
Angerona prunaria corylaria ♀

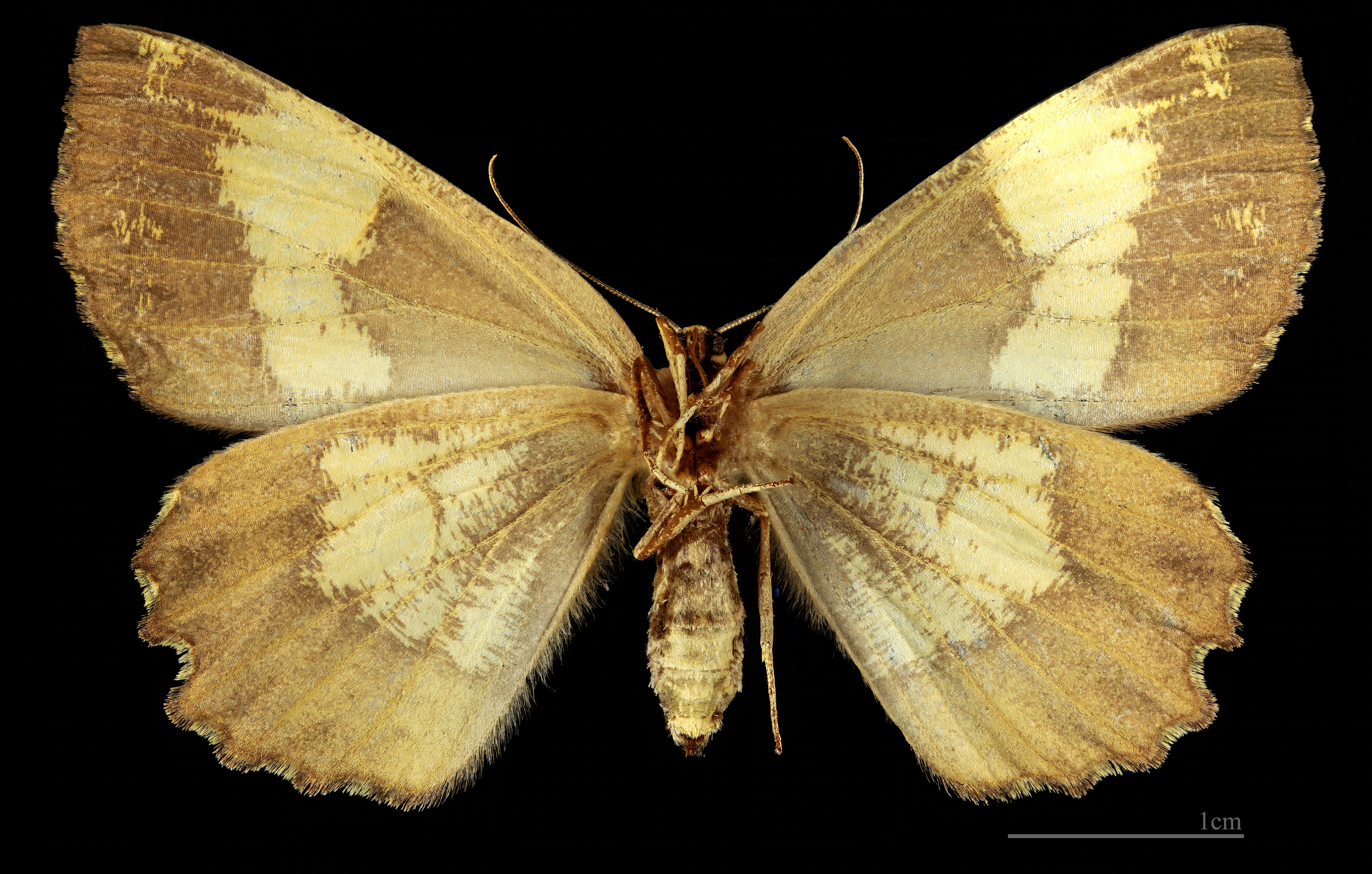
Angerona prunaria corylaria ♀ △

The ground colour is red to orange or yellow. There is a fine grey to almost black cross stippling and a transverse vein spot in females. The fringes have dark spots. The species is very variable. The males of this species are brighter in colour than the females, both sexes can be found in the typical plain orange form, as well as f. corylaria, which exhibits an orange band on a dark brown ground colour.

== Forma ==
- Angerona prunaria f. spangbergi Lampa. Dark cross-band is missing.
- Angerona prunaria f. corylaria Thunberg. The basal and marginal areas are darkened olive brown, the discal area remains in the ground colour.
- Angerona prunaria f. pickettaria Prout. With remnants of the ground colour in the disc
- Angerona prunaria f. fuscaria Prout. Monochrome dark brown wings.
- Angerona prunaria f. pallidaria Prout. Like corylaria, but grey instead of dark brown parts.

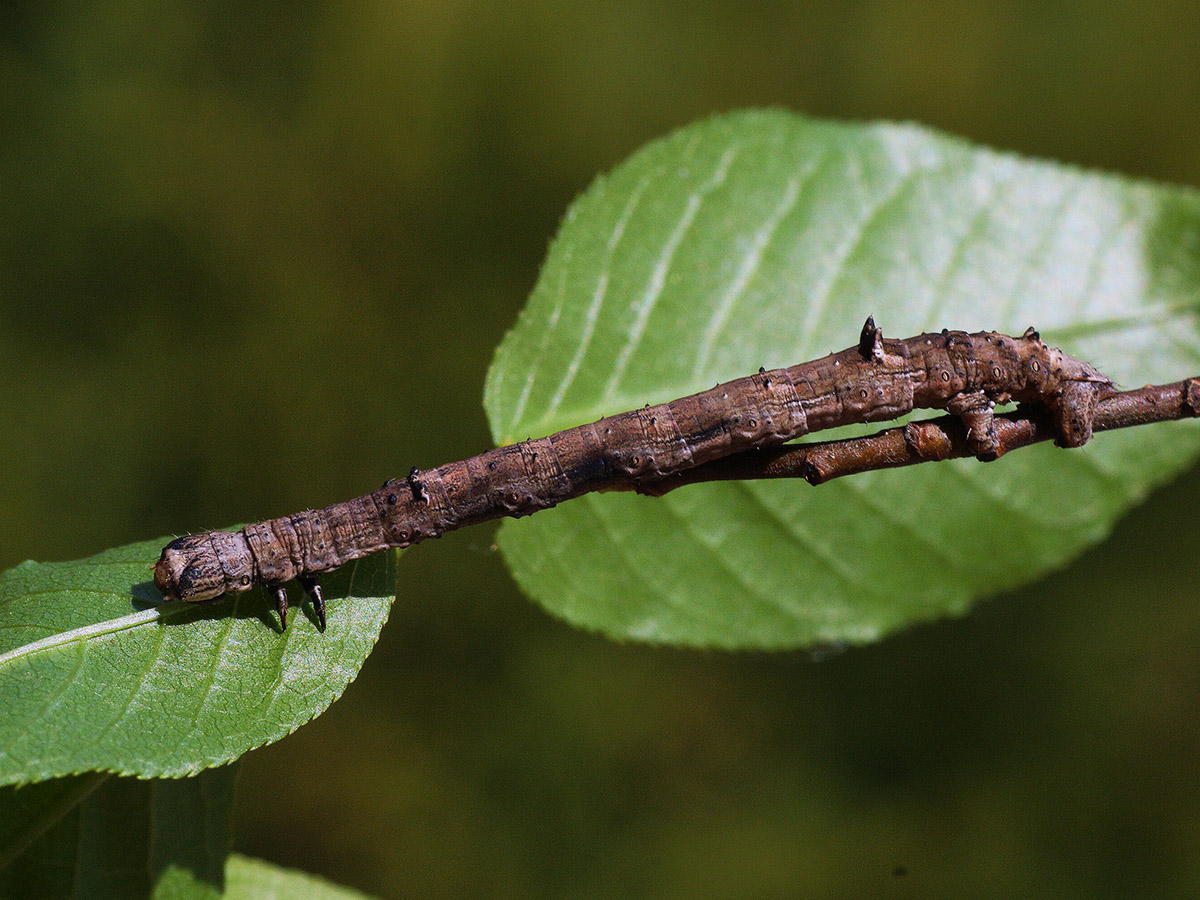
Larva

The caterpillars are also variably coloured. They resemble small dead branches to confuse predators. The body colour ranges from a pale yellowish brown to grey-brown to reddish-brown. The sides and the back are patterned with a series of black strokes and dots. On the fifth segment there is a pair of small dorsal humps, on segment ten there is an eye-catching pair of dorsal humps. The head of the caterpillars is brown, they reach a length of up to 50 millimeters

The moth prefers forest areas and is found in central and northern Europe, Russia and the Middle East and east across the Palearctic to Japan.In Hokkaido (Japan) the species is represented by the subspecies Angerona prunaria turbata Prout

The flight time is May to July.

The larva feeds on Prunus spinosa, Lonicera xylosteum, Populus tremula, Frangula dodonei and Vaccinium myrtillus.

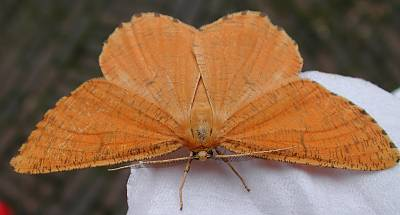

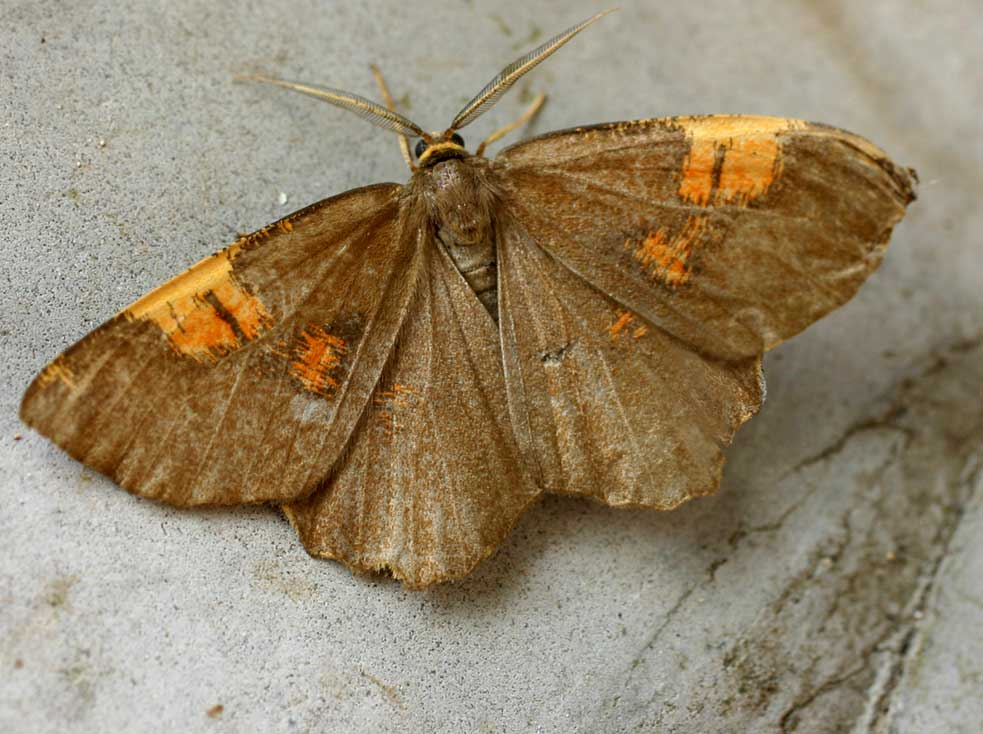
Form corylaria

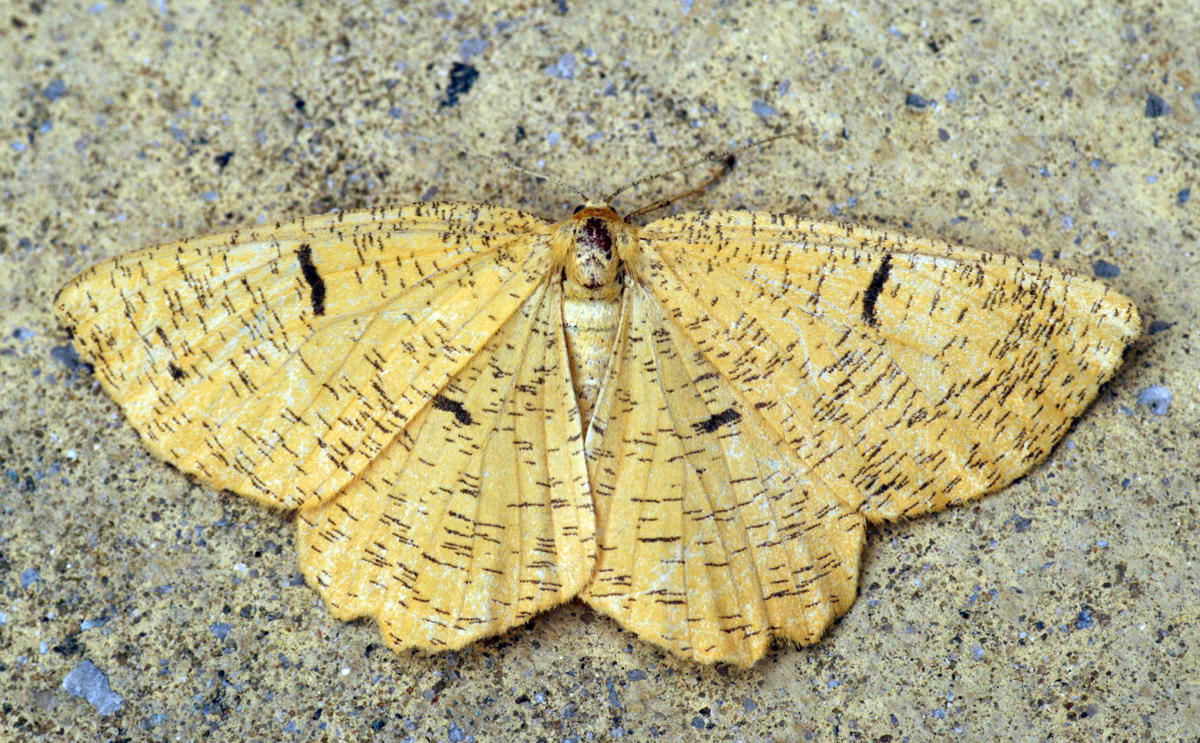
