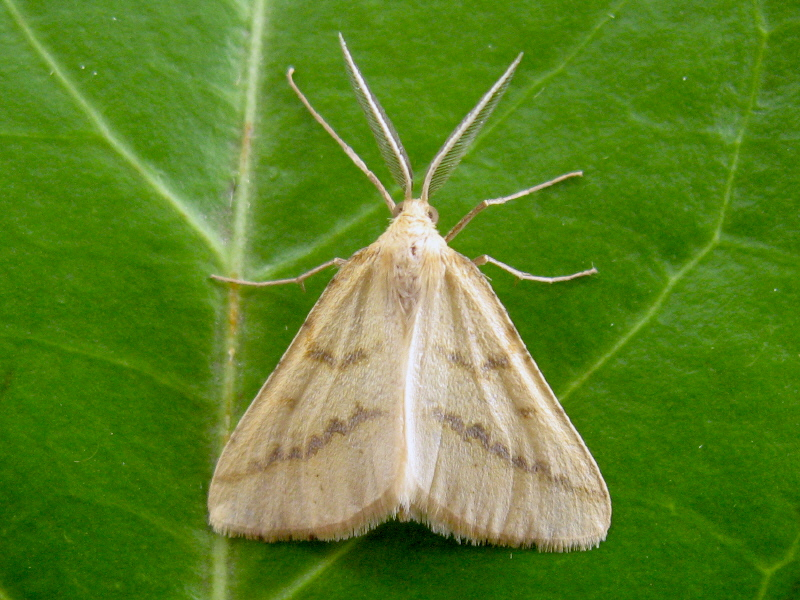

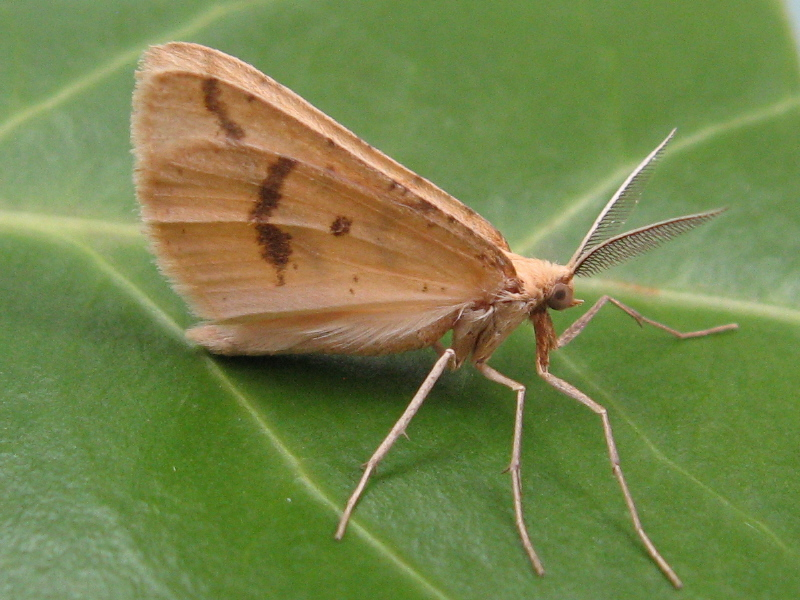

Scientific classification
- Domain: Eukaryota
- Kingdom: Animalia
- Phylum: Arthropoda
- Class: Insecta
- Order: Lepidoptera
- Family: Geometridae
- Genus: Aspitates
- Species: A. ochrearia

Binomial name
- Aspitates ochrearia (Rossi, 1794)

Synonyms
- Phalaena ochrearia Rossi, 1794; Napuca ochrearia; Semiaspilates ochrearia; Aspitates parvularia Lempke, 1952; Nyctiphanta laetula Hulst, 1896

= Aspitates ochrearia =

Species of moth

Aspitates ochrearia, the yellow belle, is a moth in the family Geometridae. The species was first described by Pietro Rossi in 1794. It is found in western and southern Europe, as well as North America.

The wingspan is 25–34 mm. Adults are on wing from April to June and again from August to September in two generations per year. It is very similar to Aspitates gilvaria.

The larvae feed on various herbaceous plants, including Daucus carota and Plantago coronopus. The larvae can be found from April to June. The species overwinters in the larval stage. Pupation takes place in spring.

== Similar species ==
- Aspitates gilvaria
