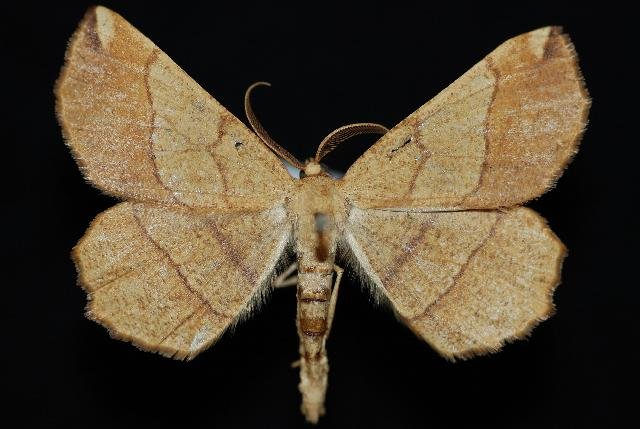

Scientific classification
- Kingdom: Animalia
- Phylum: Arthropoda
- Class: Insecta
- Order: Lepidoptera
- Family: Geometridae
- Genus: Euchlaena
- Species: E. madusaria

Binomial name
- Euchlaena madusaria (Walker, 1860)

Synonyms
- Endropia madusaria Walker, 1860; Endropia oponearia Walker, 1860; Endropia tiviaria Walker, 1860; Endropia vinosaria Grote & Robinson, 1867; Endropia vinulentaria Grote & Robinson, 1867; Euchlaena ochrearia McDunnough, 1940

= Euchlaena madusaria =

Species of moth

Euchlaena madusaria, the scrub euchlaena moth, is a species of moth of the family Geometridae. It is found in North America, where it has been recorded from British Columbia, east to Nova Scotia, south to Florida, Missouri and Oregon. The habitat consists of dry woodlands. The species is listed as threatened in Connecticut.

The wingspan is about 28 mm. Adults are mainly on wing from May to August.

The larvae are reported to feed on various trees, including oak and blueberry.

== Subspecies ==
- Euchlaena madusaria madusaria
- Euchlaena madusaria ochrearia McDunnough, 1940
