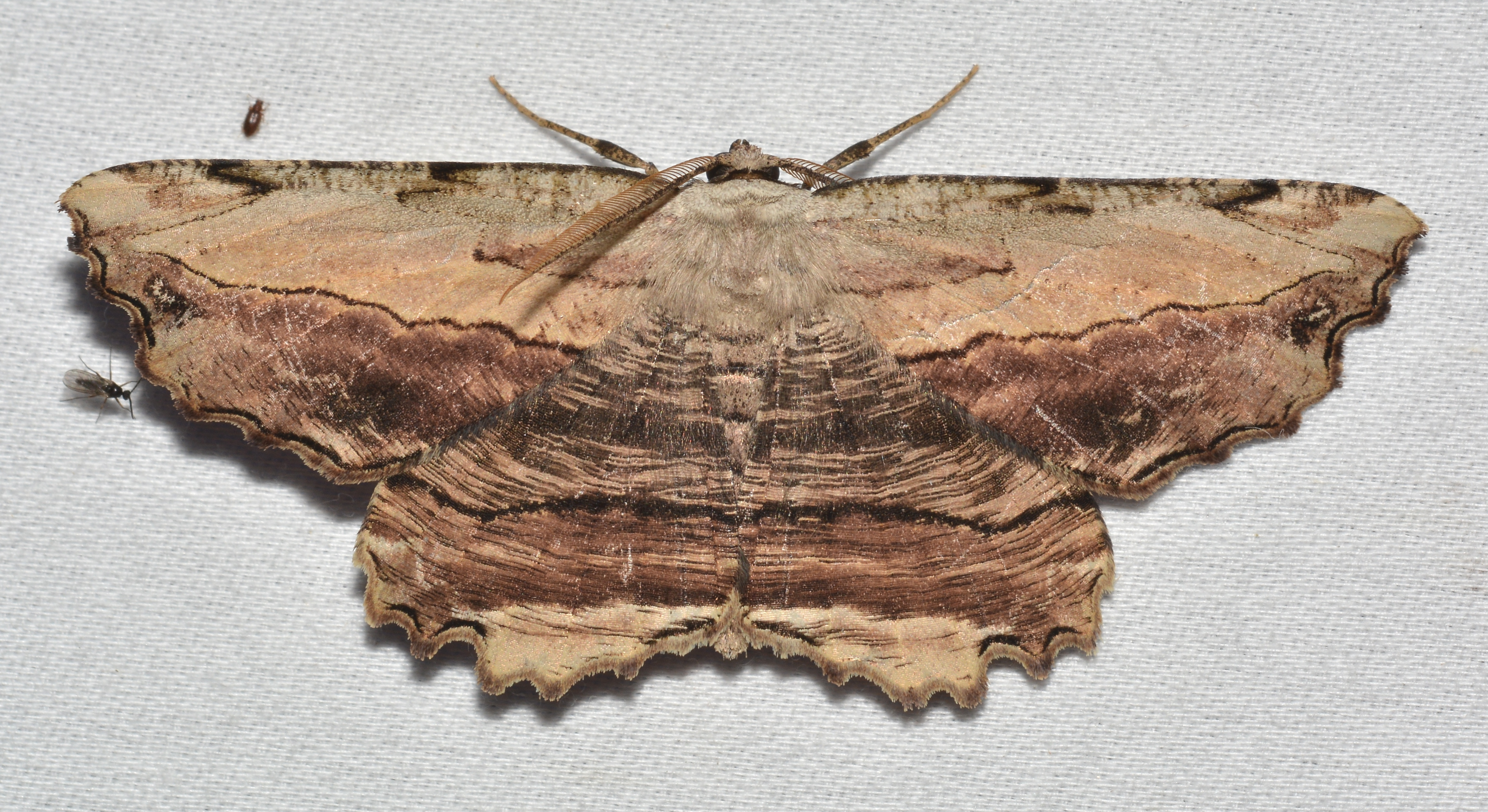
- Lytrosis unitaria

Scientific classification
- Kingdom: Animalia
- Phylum: Arthropoda
- Clade: Pancrustacea
- Class: Insecta
- Order: Lepidoptera
- Family: Geometridae
- Tribe: Angeronini
- Genus: Lytrosis; Hulst, 1896

= Lytrosis =

Genus of moths

Lytrosis is a genus of moths in the family Geometridae first described by George Duryea Hulst in 1896.

== Species ==
- Lytrosis heitzmanorum Rindge, 1971
- Lytrosis permagnaria (Packard, 1876)
- Lytrosis sinuosa Rindge, 1971
- Lytrosis unitaria (Herrich-Schäffer, 1854)
