= Aspitates forbesi =

Scientific classification
- Kingdom: Animalia
- Phylum: Arthropoda
- Clade: Pancrustacea
- Class: Insecta
- Order: Lepidoptera
- Family: Geometridae
- Genus: Aspitates
- Species: A. forbesi

Binomial name
- Aspitates forbesi Munroe, 1963

Species of moth

Aspitates forbesi is a species of geometrid moth in the family Geometridae. It is found in North America.
