= Xanthotype rufaria =

Scientific classification
- Domain: Eukaryota
- Kingdom: Animalia
- Phylum: Arthropoda
- Class: Insecta
- Order: Lepidoptera
- Family: Geometridae
- Tribe: Angeronini
- Genus: Xanthotype
- Species: X. rufaria

Binomial name
- Xanthotype rufaria Swett, 1918

Species of moth

Xanthotype rufaria, the rufous geometer moth, is a species of geometrid moth in the family Geometridae. It is found in North America.

The MONA or Hodges number for Xanthotype rufaria is 6742.
