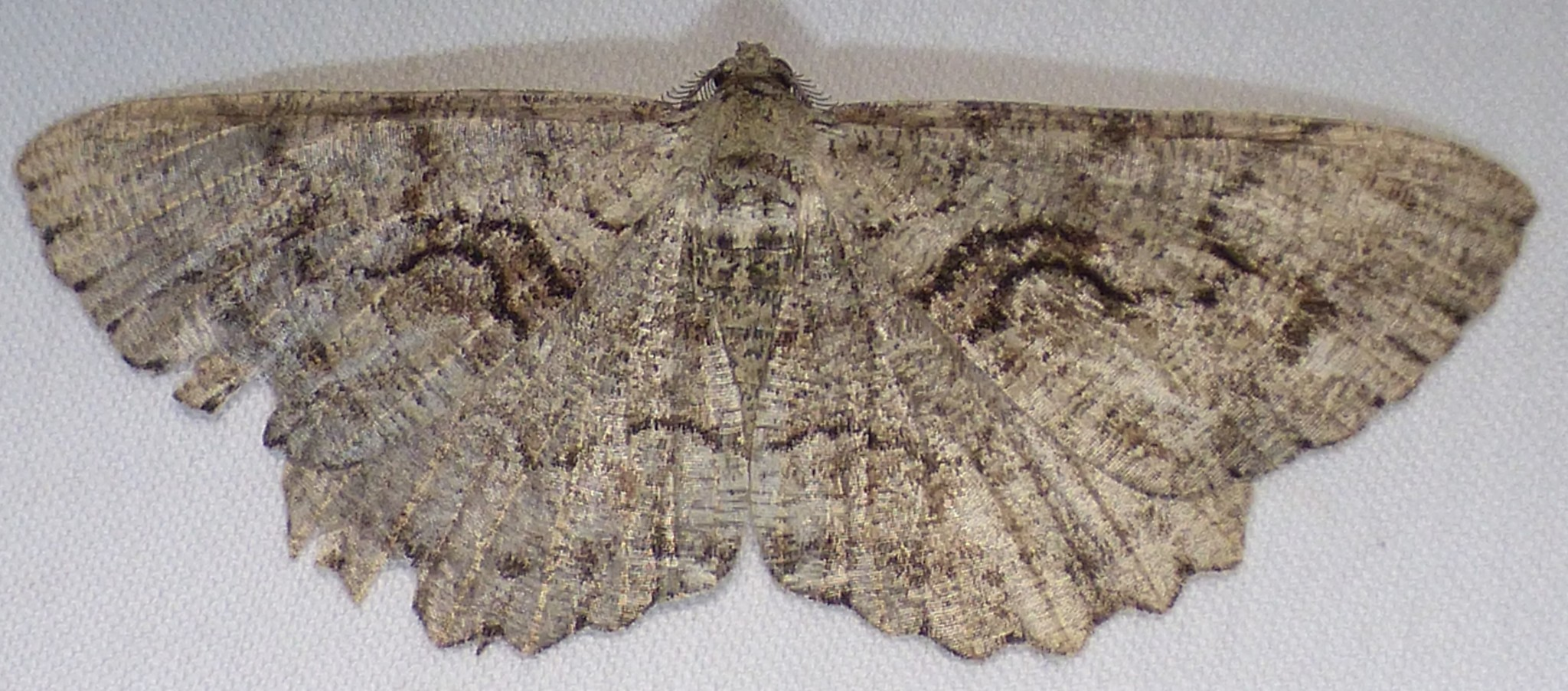

Scientific classification
- Kingdom: Animalia
- Phylum: Arthropoda
- Clade: Pancrustacea
- Class: Insecta
- Order: Lepidoptera
- Family: Geometridae
- Genus: Cymatophora; Hübner, 1812
- Species: C. approximaria

Binomial name
- Cymatophora approximaria Hübner, 1812

Synonyms
- Stenotrachelys Guenée, 1857

= Cymatophora =

Giant gray moth

Genus of moths

Cymatophora is a genus of moths in the family Geometridae erected by Jacob Hübner in 1812. It is monotypic, being represented by the single species, the giant gray moth (Cymatophora approximaria). It is found mostly in the south-eastern United States. It is found in North America.
