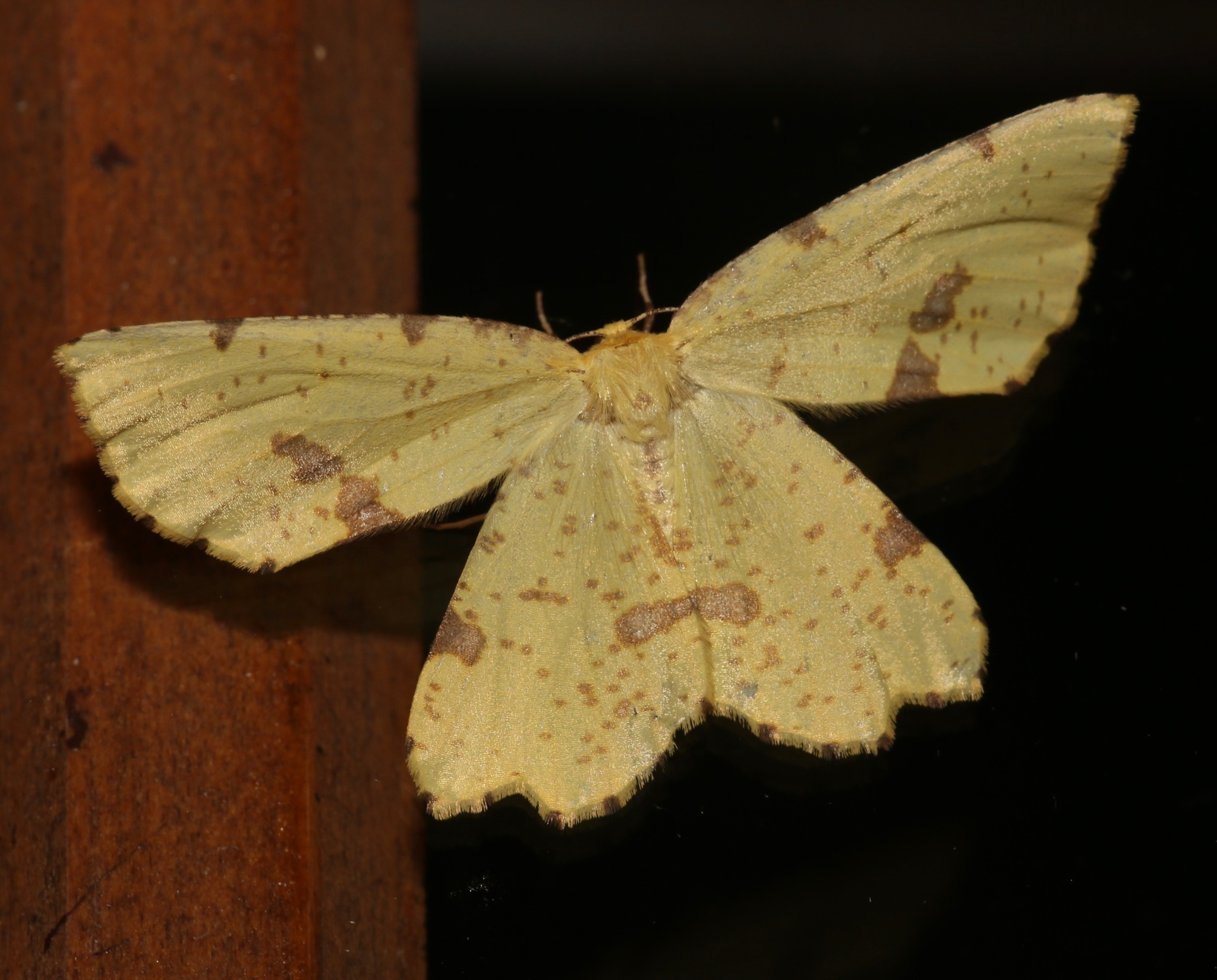

Scientific classification
- Domain: Eukaryota
- Kingdom: Animalia
- Phylum: Arthropoda
- Class: Insecta
- Order: Lepidoptera
- Family: Geometridae
- Genus: Xanthotype
- Species: X. sospeta

Binomial name
- Xanthotype sospeta (Drury, 1773)

Synonyms
- List: Phalaena sospeta Drury, 1773; Angerona caelaria Hulst, 1886; Therapis citrinaria Hubner, 1824; Phalaena crocataria Fabricius, 1798; Xanthotype manitobensis Swett, 1918; Xanthotype marylandensis Swett, 1918; Angerona sospetaria Guenee, 1858

= Xanthotype sospeta =

Species of moth

Xanthotype sospeta, the crocus geometer, is a species of moth in the family Geometridae. It was first described by Dru Drury in 1773 from Jamaica. It is also found in North America, where it has been recorded from Nova Scotia to southern British Columbia, south to Colorado and Georgia. The habitat consists of deciduous and mixedwood forests.

== Description ==
Upperside: antennae filiform. Head pale yellow. Eyes dark brown. Tongue spiral. Thorax, abdomen, and wings pale yellow. On the posterior edges of the anterior wings are placed two faint brown streaks; one, which is smallest, being about a quarter of an inch from the shoulders, the other the same distance from the lower corners; about the same distance from the tips, on the anterior edges, is placed another very small one. Posterior wings having likewise two of these faint spots, one on the anterior, the other on the abdominal edges.

Underside: sides, breast, and abdomen pale yellow. Legs brown and yellow. Wings pale yellow, with the same spots and marks as on the upper side, but more distinct. The wings are a little angulated. Wingspan nearly 2 1/2 inches (62 mm).

== Biology ==
The larvae are feed on a wide variety of low-growing shrubs and herbs, including Salix, Cornus and Viburnum species. They are twig mimics.
