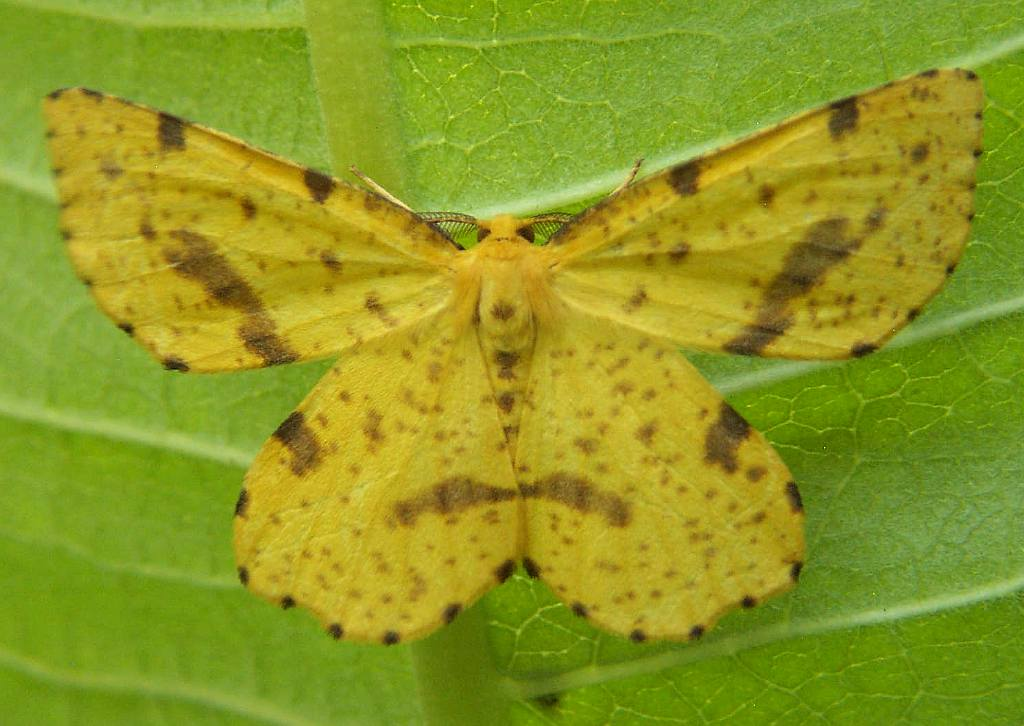
- False crocus geometer, Xanthotype urticaria

Scientific classification
- Kingdom: Animalia
- Phylum: Arthropoda
- Clade: Pancrustacea
- Class: Insecta
- Order: Lepidoptera
- Family: Geometridae
- Subfamily: Ennominae
- Tribe: Angeronini; Forbes, 1948

Synonyms
- Aspilatini Duponchel, 1845 (lapsus); Aspilatites Duponchel, 1845 (lapsus); Aspitatini Duponchel, 1845

= Angeronini =

Tribe of moths

The Angeronini are a small tribe of geometer moths in the subfamily Ennominae. The tribe was first described by William Trowbridge Merrifield Forbes in 1948. As numerous ennomine genera have not yet been assigned to a tribe, the genus list is preliminary.

== Genera ==
- Angerona Duponchel, 1829
- Lytrosis Hulst, 1896
- Euchlaena Hübner, 1823
- Xanthotype Warren, 1894
- Cymatophora Hübner, 1812
