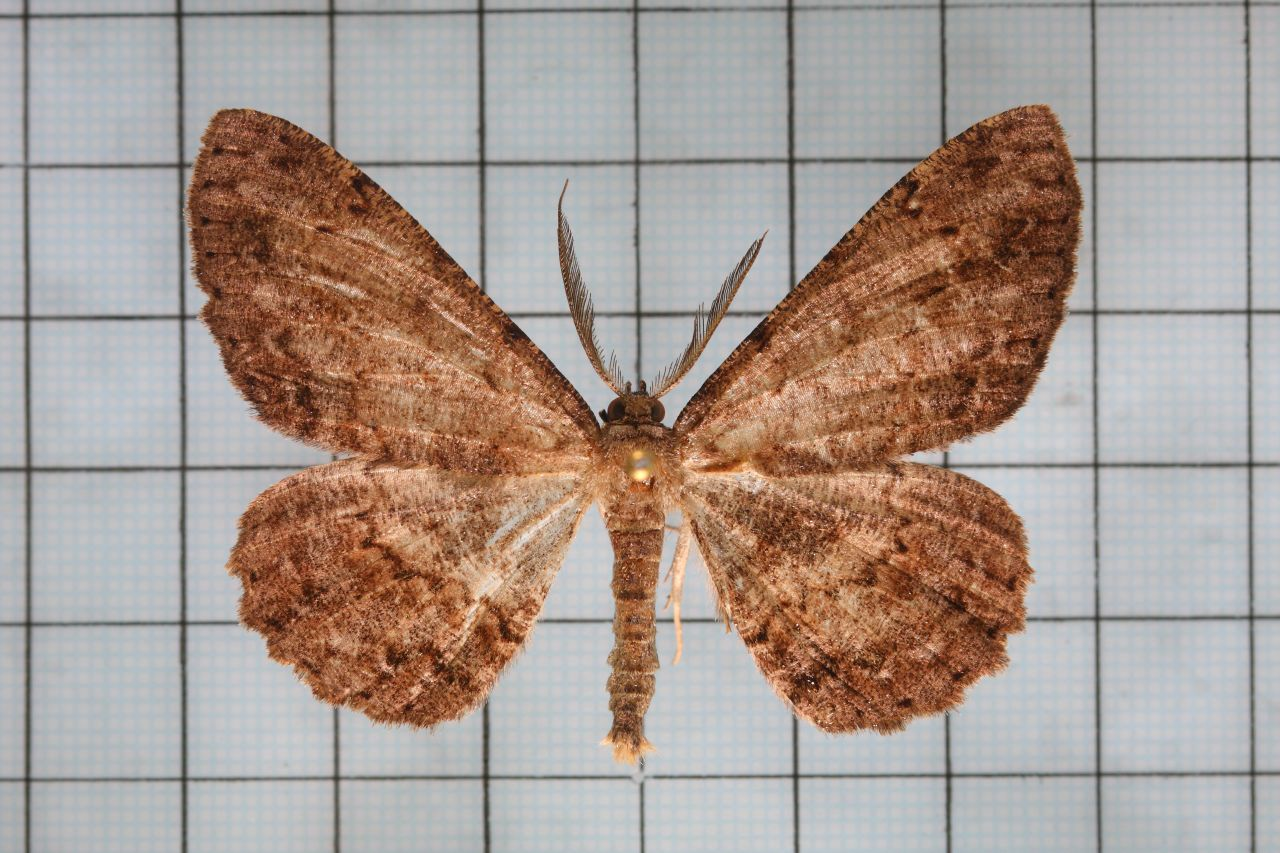

Scientific classification
- Domain: Eukaryota
- Kingdom: Animalia
- Phylum: Arthropoda
- Class: Insecta
- Order: Lepidoptera
- Family: Geometridae
- Genus: Hypomecis
- Species: H. formosana

Binomial name
- Hypomecis formosana (Wileman, 1912)

Synonyms
- Alcis formosana Wileman, 1912

= Hypomecis formosana =

Species of moth

Hypomecis formosana is a species of moth of the family Geometridae. It is found in Taiwan.
