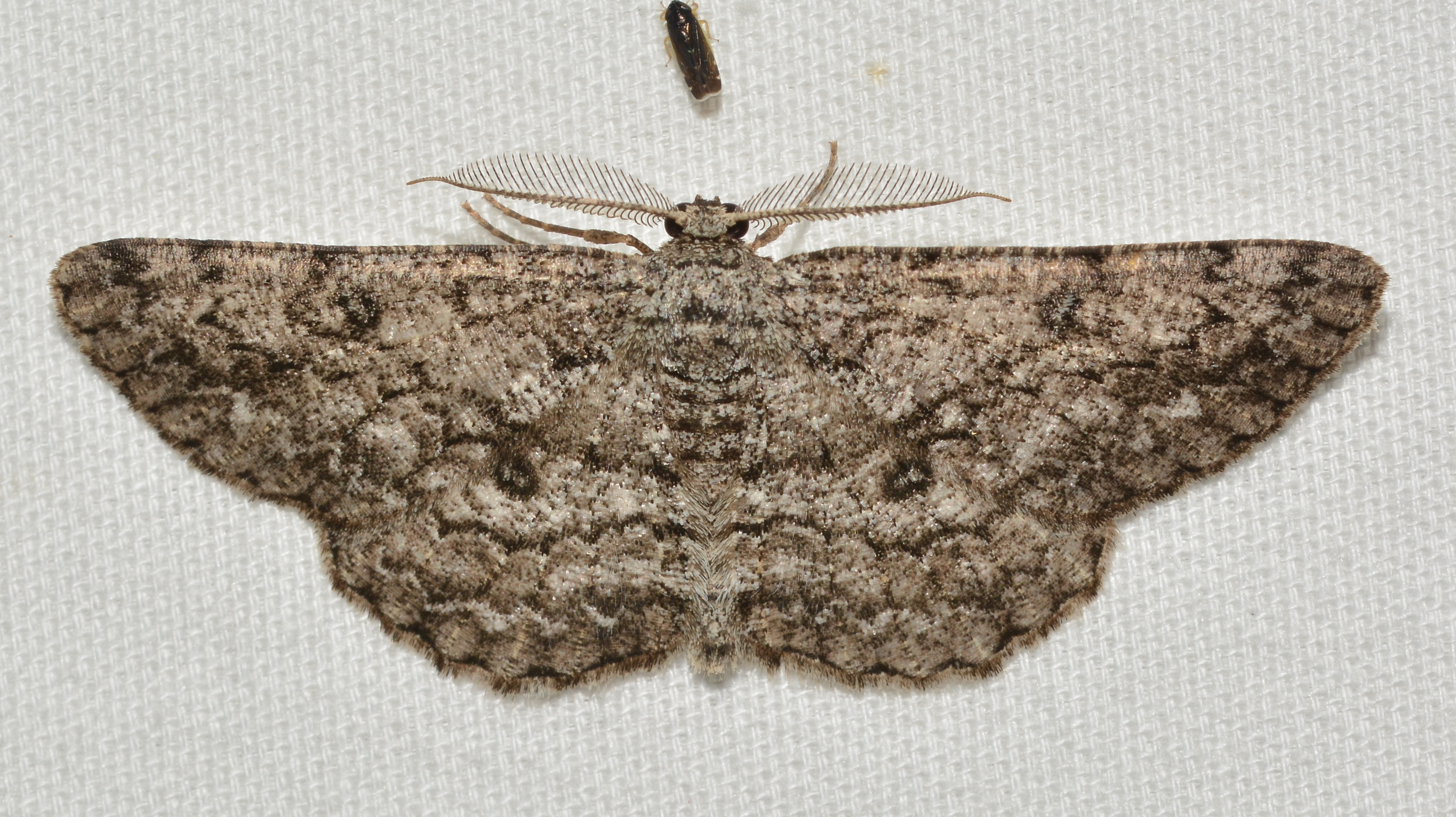

Scientific classification
- Kingdom: Animalia
- Phylum: Arthropoda
- Clade: Pancrustacea
- Class: Insecta
- Order: Lepidoptera
- Family: Geometridae
- Genus: Hypomecis
- Species: H. umbrosaria

Binomial name
- Hypomecis umbrosaria (Hübner, 1813)

= Hypomecis umbrosaria =

Umber moth

Species of moth

Hypomecis umbrosaria, the umber moth, is a species of geometrid moth in the family Geometridae. It is found in North America.

The MONA or Hodges number for Hypomecis umbrosaria is 6439.
