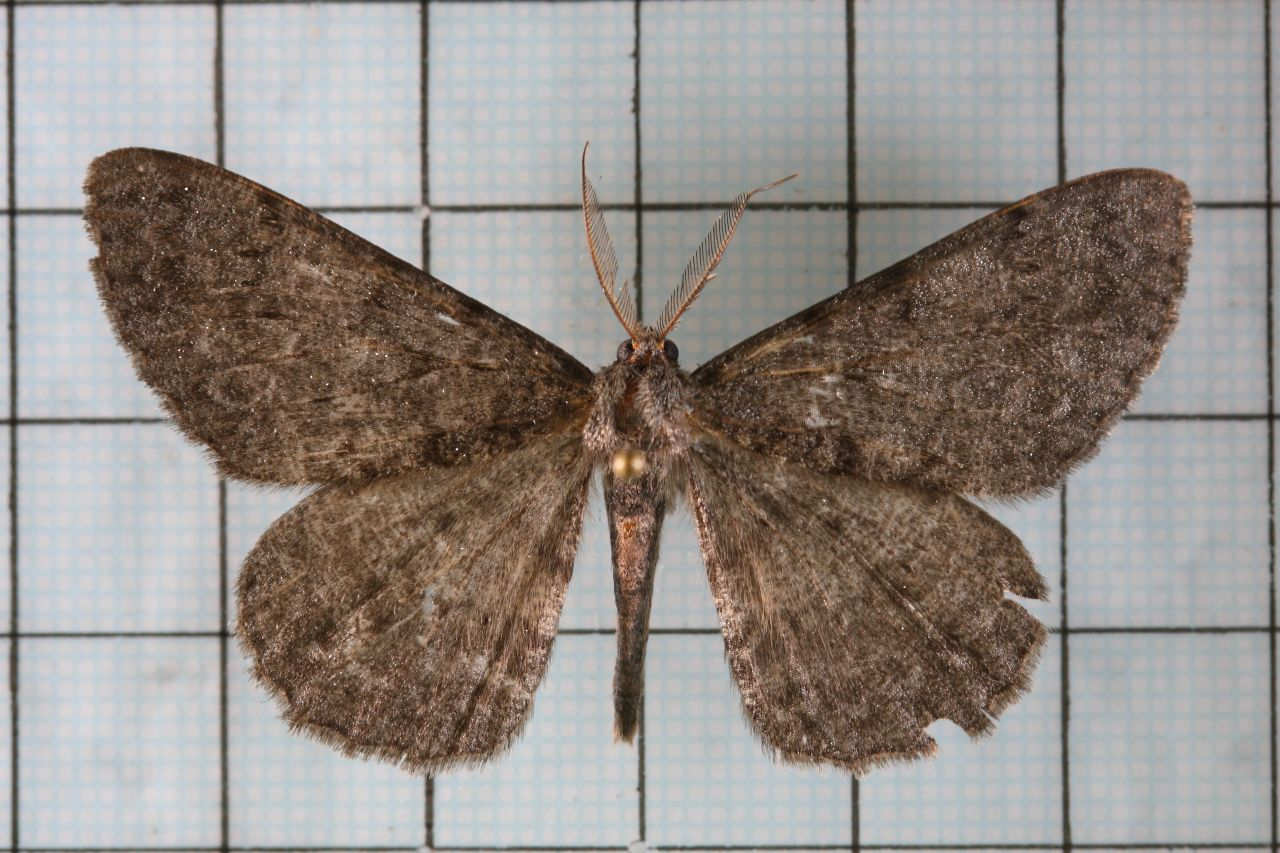

Scientific classification
- Kingdom: Animalia
- Phylum: Arthropoda
- Class: Insecta
- Order: Lepidoptera
- Family: Geometridae
- Genus: Hypomecis
- Species: H. monotona

Binomial name
- Hypomecis monotona (Inoue, 1978)

Synonyms
- Boarmia monotona Inoue, 1978

= Hypomecis monotona =

Species of moth

Hypomecis monotona is a species of moth of the family Geometridae. It is found in Taiwan.
