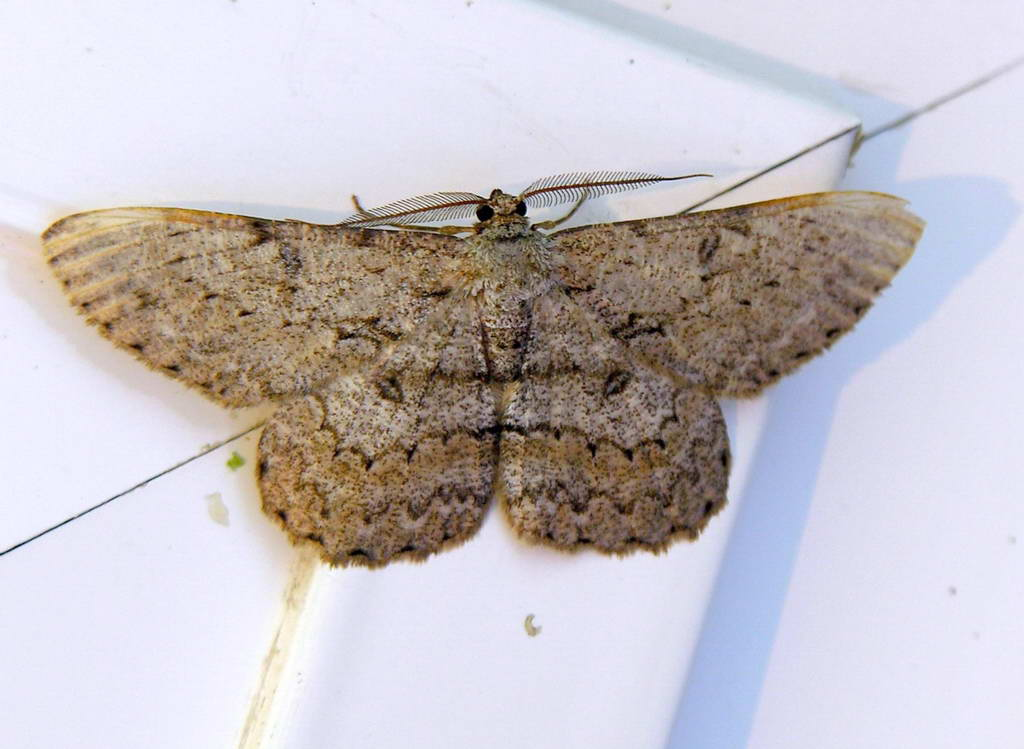

Scientific classification
- Domain: Eukaryota
- Kingdom: Animalia
- Phylum: Arthropoda
- Class: Insecta
- Order: Lepidoptera
- Family: Geometridae
- Genus: Hypomecis
- Species: H. punctinalis

Binomial name
- Hypomecis punctinalis (Scopoli, 1763)

Synonyms
- Serreca punctinalis

= Hypomecis punctinalis =

Species of moth

Hypomecis punctinalis, the pale oak beauty, is a moth of the family Geometridae. The species was first described by Giovanni Antonio Scopoli in his 1763 Entomologia Carniolica. The species can be found in central and southern Europe, Asia Minor, Transcaucasia, Russia, the Russian Far East, Japan, Korea, Ussuri and western China.

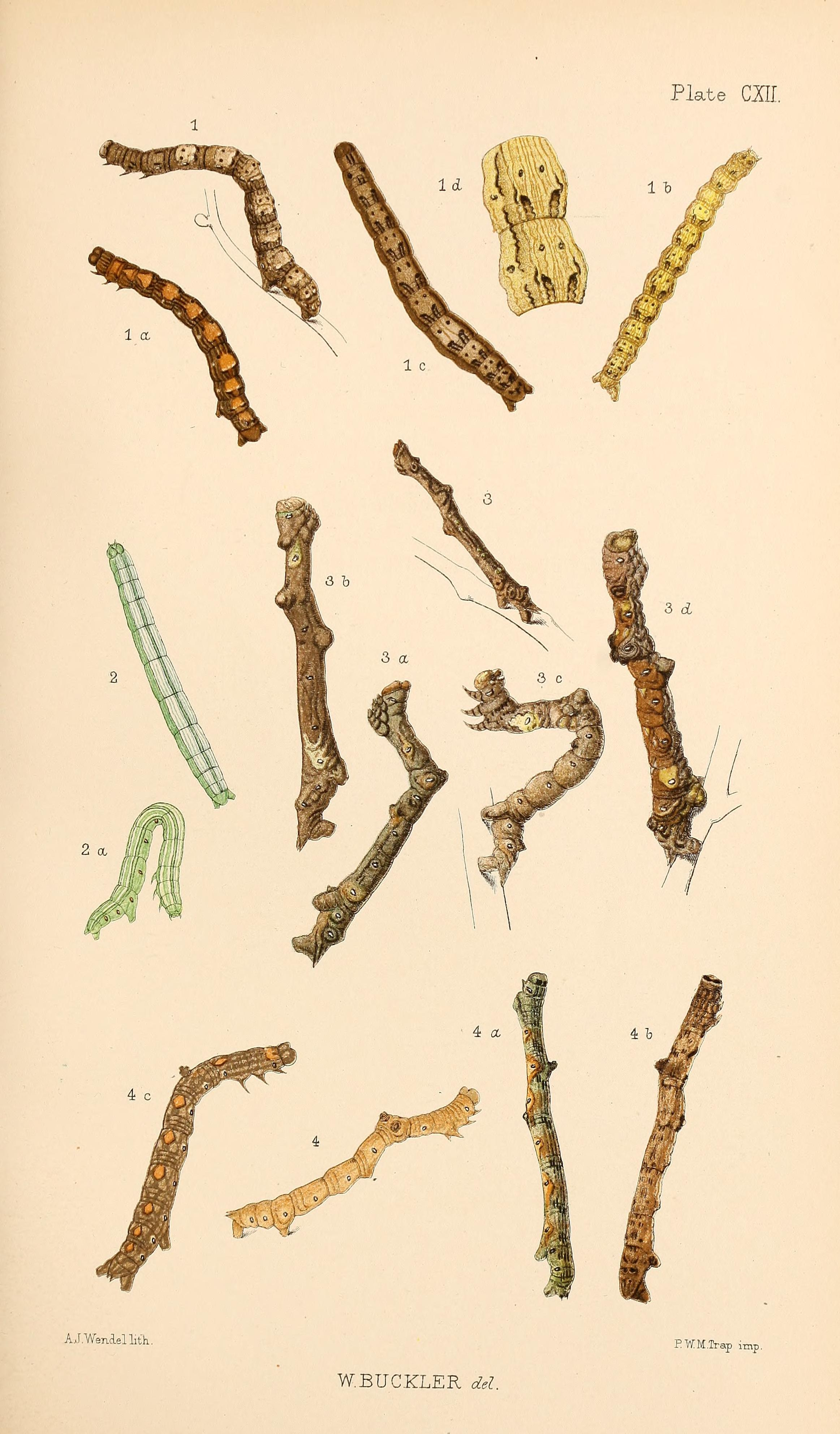
Fig4,4a,4b,4c Larvae in various stages

The wingspan is 46–55 mm. The length of the forewings is 22–26 mm. The forewings have a grey-white ground colour with a brownish tinge and are fine blackish dusted. The outer margin of the forewing has a convexity. The forewings have conspicuous transverse lines and a clear discal mark. The discal mark is pale centred and dark ringed. The forewings of the male have a fovea. The hindwings are similarly marked. The hindwing median and second lines are conspicuously dark and wavy.

The moths fly in one generation from the end of April to July.

The larvae feed on various trees including oak and birch.

Similar species:

- Hypomecis roboraria (H.roboraria has a pale spot on a dark background at the apex forewing underside which is not present in H. punctinalis
- Hypomecis species

== Notes ==
1. The flight season refers to the Belgium and the Netherlands. This may vary in other parts of the range.
