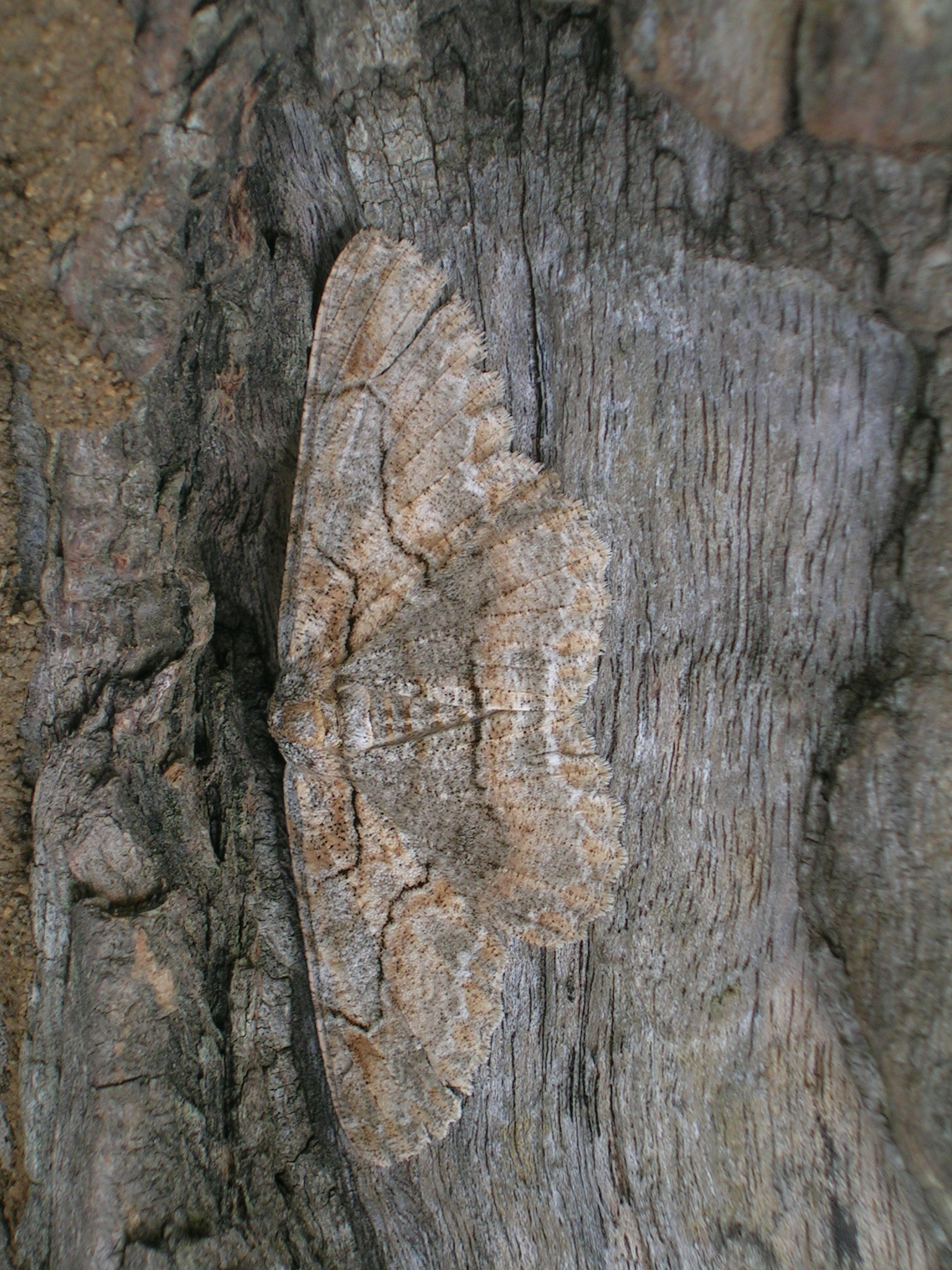
- Hypomecis species from southern India

Scientific classification
- Kingdom: Animalia
- Phylum: Arthropoda
- Clade: Pancrustacea
- Class: Insecta
- Order: Lepidoptera
- Family: Geometridae
- Subfamily: Ennominae
- Tribe: Boarmiini
- Genus: Hypomecis; Hübner, 1821

Synonyms
- Boarmia Treitschke, 1825; Cymatophora Hübner, [1806]; Dryocoetis Hübner, [1825]; Alcippe Gumppenberg, 1887 (preocc.); Narapa Moore, [1887]; Pseudangerona Moore, [1887]; Serraca Moore, [1887]; Astacuda Moore, 1888; Maidana Swinhoe, 1900; Pseudoboarmia McDunnough, 1920; Erobatodes Wehrli, 1943

= Hypomecis =

Genus of moths

Hypomecis is a genus of moths in the family Geometridae first described by Jacob Hübner in 1821.

== Description ==
Palpi oblique, reaching beyond the frons and fringed with hair below. Forewings with slightly crenulate (scalloped) cilia. Vein 3 from near angle of cell and veins 7 to 9 from near upper angle. Typically with vein 10 and 11 arise from cell. Hindwings with vein 3 from near angle of cell. Cilia crenulate.

== Ecology ==
Most of them are patterned cryptically and when they sit on bark, the markings appear like patches of lichen. Studies have shown that they choose the site for resting with care so that the pattern of crypsis is enhanced.

== Selected species ==
Species include:

- Hypomecis adamata (Felder, 1874)
- Hypomecis brevifasciata (Wileman, 1911)
- Hypomecis buchholzaria (Lemmer, 1937)
- Hypomecis ceylanicaria Nietner, 1861
- Hypomecis cineracea (Moore, 1888)
- Hypomecis corticea (Bastelberger, 1911)
- Hypomecis driophila Goldfinch, 1944
- Hypomecis formosana (Wileman, 1912)
- Hypomecis gnopharia (Guenée in Boisduval & Guenée, 1858)
- Hypomecis intectaria (Walker 1863)
- Hypomecis longipectinaria A. Blanchard & Knudson, 1984
- Hypomecis lunifera (Butler, 1879)
- Hypomecis luridula (Hulst, 1896)
- Hypomecis monotona (Inoue, 1978)
- Hypomecis nudicosta Inoue, 1983
- Hypomecis obliquisigna (Wileman, 1912)
- Hypomecis percnioides (Wehrli, 1943)
- Hypomecis punctinalis (Scopoli, 1763) – pale oak beauty
- Hypomecis roboraria (Denis & Schiffermüller, 1775) – great oak beauty
- Hypomecis separata (Walker 1863)
- Hypomecis transcissa (Walker, 1860)
- Hypomecis umbrosaria (Hübner, 1813)
