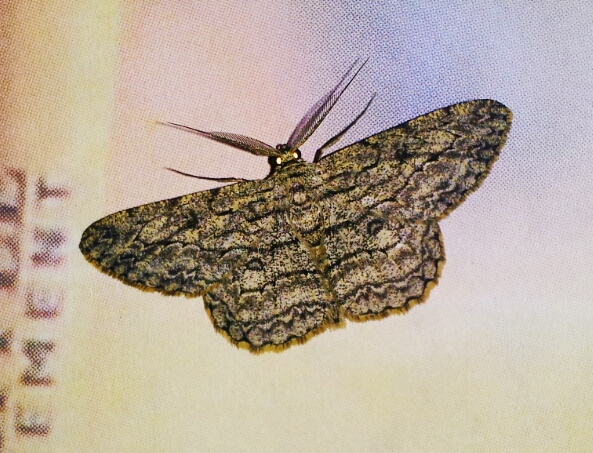

Scientific classification
- Kingdom: Animalia
- Phylum: Arthropoda
- Class: Insecta
- Order: Lepidoptera
- Family: Geometridae
- Genus: Hypomecis
- Species: H. transcissa

Binomial name
- Hypomecis transcissa (Walker, 1860)

Synonyms
- Boarmia transcissa Walker, 1860; Boarmia lineataria Walker, 1866; Chogada latipennis Butler, 1881

= Hypomecis transcissa =

Species of moth

Hypomecis transcissa is a moth of the family Geometridae first described by Francis Walker in 1860. It is found in the Indian subregion and from Sri Lanka to Sundaland.

Host plants include Aleurites species.
