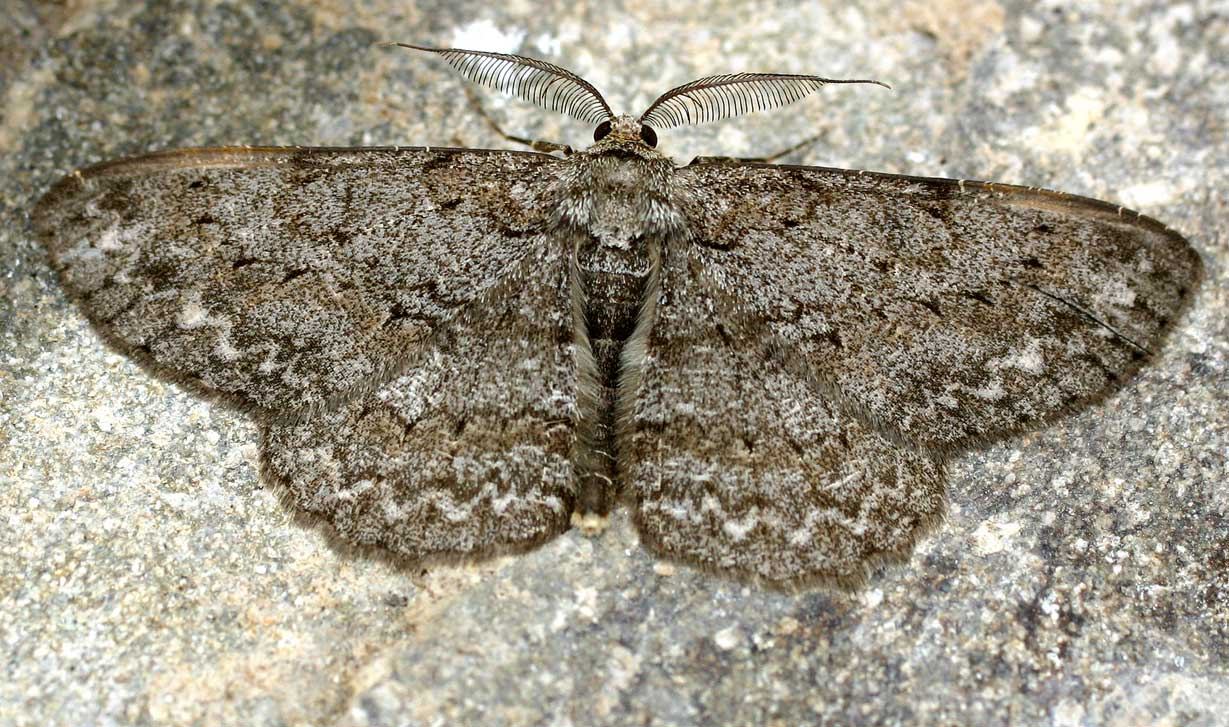

Scientific classification
- Kingdom: Animalia
- Phylum: Arthropoda
- Class: Insecta
- Order: Lepidoptera
- Family: Geometridae
- Genus: Hypomecis
- Species: H. roboraria

Binomial name
- Hypomecis roboraria (Denis & Schiffermüller, 1775)

Synonyms
- Boarmia roboraria

= Hypomecis roboraria =

Species of moth

Hypomecis roboraria, the great oak beauty, is a moth of the family Geometridae. The species occurs in the Palearctic. The nominate subspecies is found in Europe. The subspecies isabellaria is found in western Central Asia east across Siberia and Mongolia to northern China.

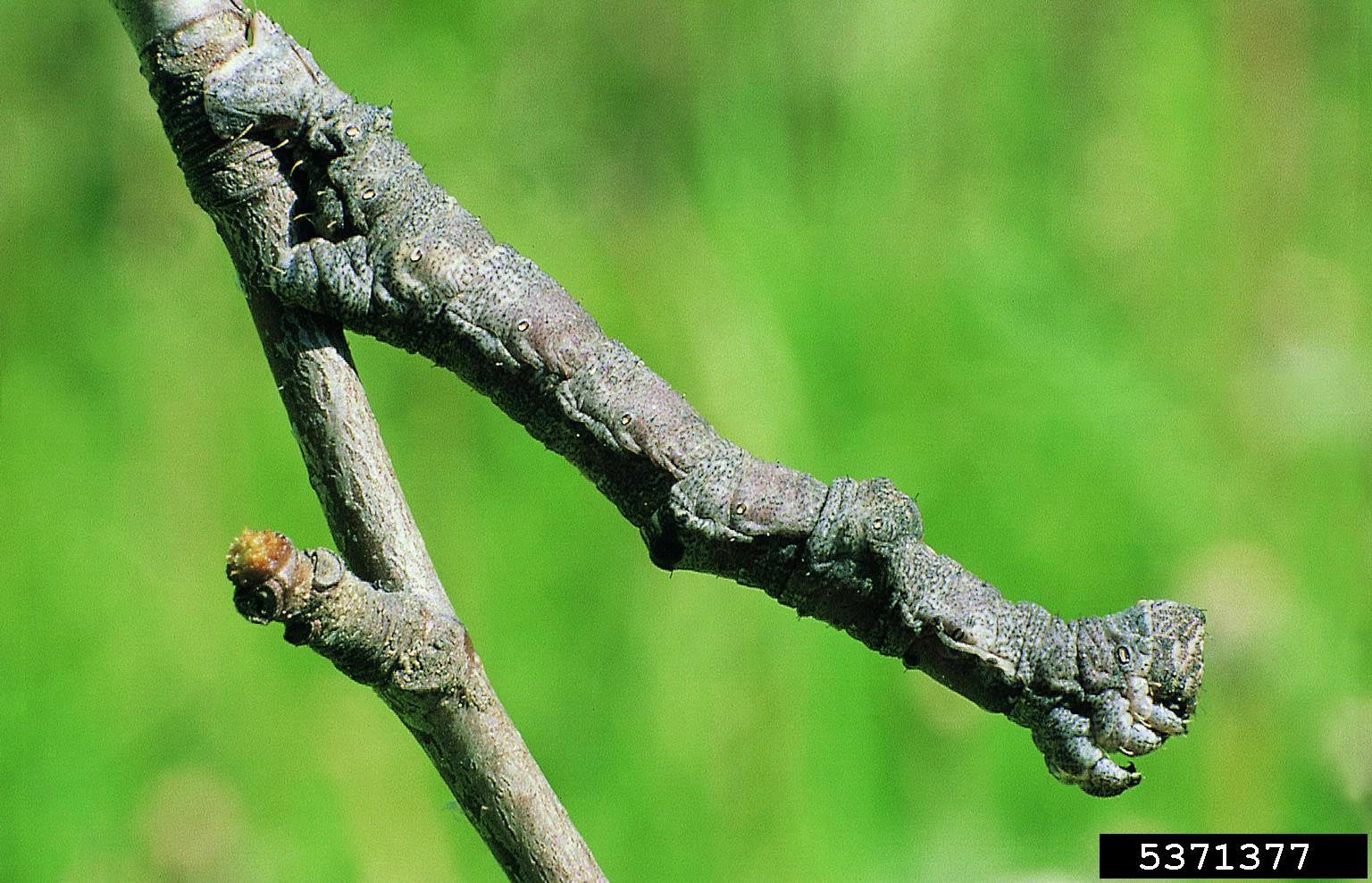
Caterpillar

The wingspan is 40–50 mm. The male has feather-shaped antennae, the female thread-shaped. The forewings have three narrow, wavy, dark cross-bands that are clear at the front edge, often blurry further back. The hindwings have two such cross bands, one of which is usually quite clear. The larva is naked, brown and gnarled and strongly resembles a dead oak twig.

The moths fly from May to August. The caterpillars feed on oak.

Similar species include Hypomecis punctinalis and Hypomecis sp.

== Notes ==
1. The flight season refers to the Belgium and The Netherlands. This may vary in other parts of the range.

== Bibliography ==
- Kulfan, Miroslav; Holecová, Milada; Fajčík, Jaroslav (2006). "Caterpillar (Lepidoptera) communities on European Turkey oak (Quercus cerris) in Malé Karpaty Mts (SW Slovakia)". Biologia. 61 (5): 573–578. doi:10.2478/s11756-006-0092-y. ISSN 0006-3088.
- Kang, C.-K.; Moon, J.-Y.; Lee, S.-I.; Jablonski, P. G. (2012). "Camouflage through an active choice of a resting spot and body orientation in moths". Journal of Evolutionary Biology. 25: 1695–1702. doi:10.1111/j.1420-9101.2012.02557.x. ISSN 1010-061X. PMID 22775528.
- Simonsen, Thomas J.; Kristensen, Niels P. (2003). "Scale length/wing length correlation in Lepidoptera (Insecta)". Journal of Natural History. 37 (6): 673–679. doi:10.1080/00222930110096735. ISSN 0022-2933.
