= Hypomecis buchholzaria =

Scientific classification
- Domain: Eukaryota
- Kingdom: Animalia
- Phylum: Arthropoda
- Class: Insecta
- Order: Lepidoptera
- Family: Geometridae
- Tribe: Boarmiini
- Genus: Hypomecis
- Species: H. buchholzaria

Binomial name
- Hypomecis buchholzaria (Lemmer, 1937)

Synonyms
- Pseudoboarmia buchholzaria Lemmer, 1937

Species of moth

Hypomecis buchholzaria, known generally as the blue spiderwort moth or Buchholz's gray, is a species of geometrid moth in the family Geometridae. It is found in North America.

The MONA or Hodges number for Hypomecis buchholzaria is 6438.
