= Hypomecis adamata =

Scientific classification
- Kingdom: Animalia
- Phylum: Arthropoda
- Class: Insecta
- Order: Lepidoptera
- Family: Geometridae
- Genus: Hypomecis
- Species: H. adamata

Binomial name
- Hypomecis adamata (Felder, 1874)

Synonyms
- Boarmia adamata Felder, 1874

Species of moth

Hypomecis adamata is a species of moth in the family Geometridae. It is found in Sri Lanka.
