= Hypomecis longipectinaria =

Scientific classification
- Kingdom: Animalia
- Phylum: Arthropoda
- Clade: Pancrustacea
- Class: Insecta
- Order: Lepidoptera
- Family: Geometridae
- Tribe: Boarmiini
- Genus: Hypomecis
- Species: H. longipectinaria

Binomial name
- Hypomecis longipectinaria A. Blanchard & Knudson, 1984

Species of moth

Hypomecis longipectinaria, the hybrid fescue, is a species of geometrid moth in the family Geometridae. It is found in North America.

The MONA or Hodges number for Hypomecis longipectinaria is 6439.1.
