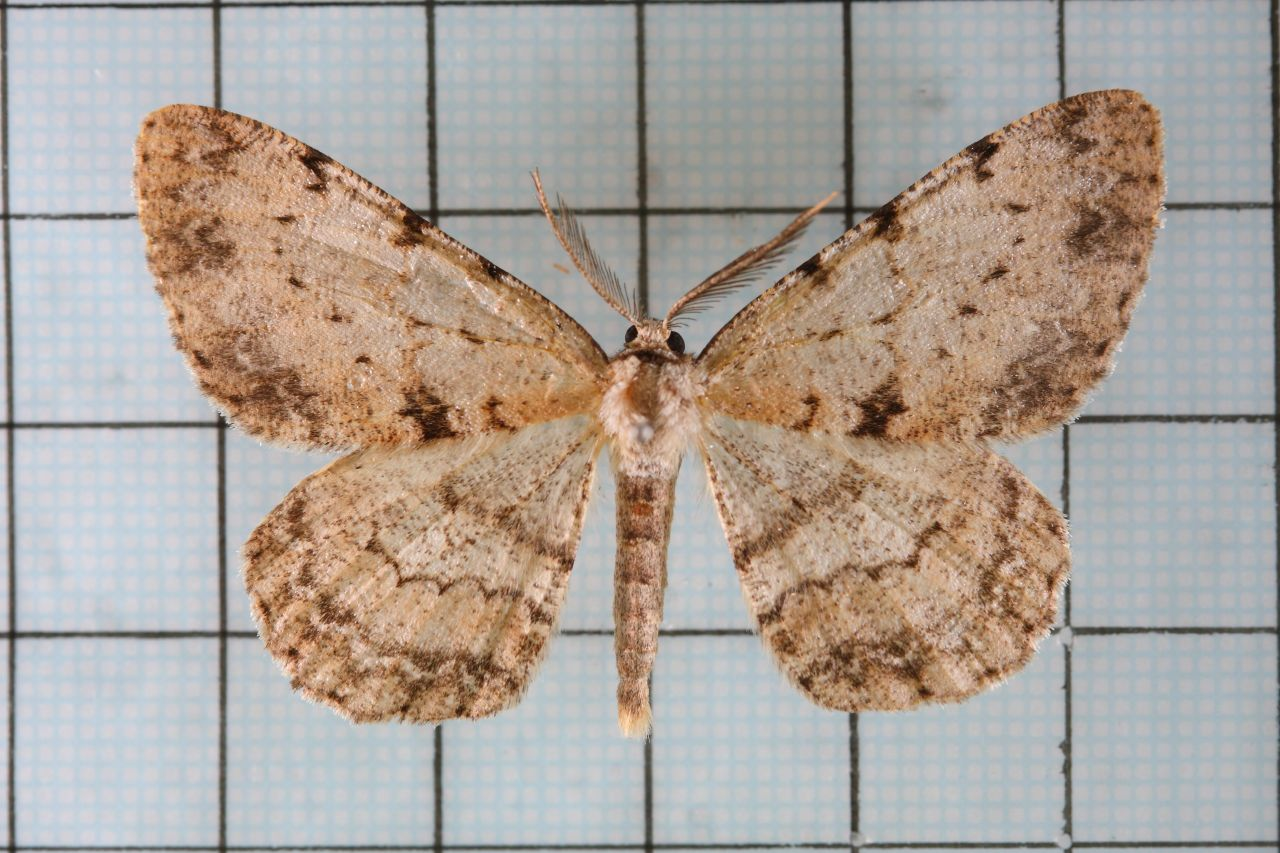

Scientific classification
- Kingdom: Animalia
- Phylum: Arthropoda
- Class: Insecta
- Order: Lepidoptera
- Family: Geometridae
- Genus: Hypomecis
- Species: H. nudicosta

Binomial name
- Hypomecis nudicosta Inoue, 1983

= Hypomecis nudicosta =

Species of moth

Hypomecis nudicosta is a species of moth of the family Geometridae. It is found in Taiwan.
