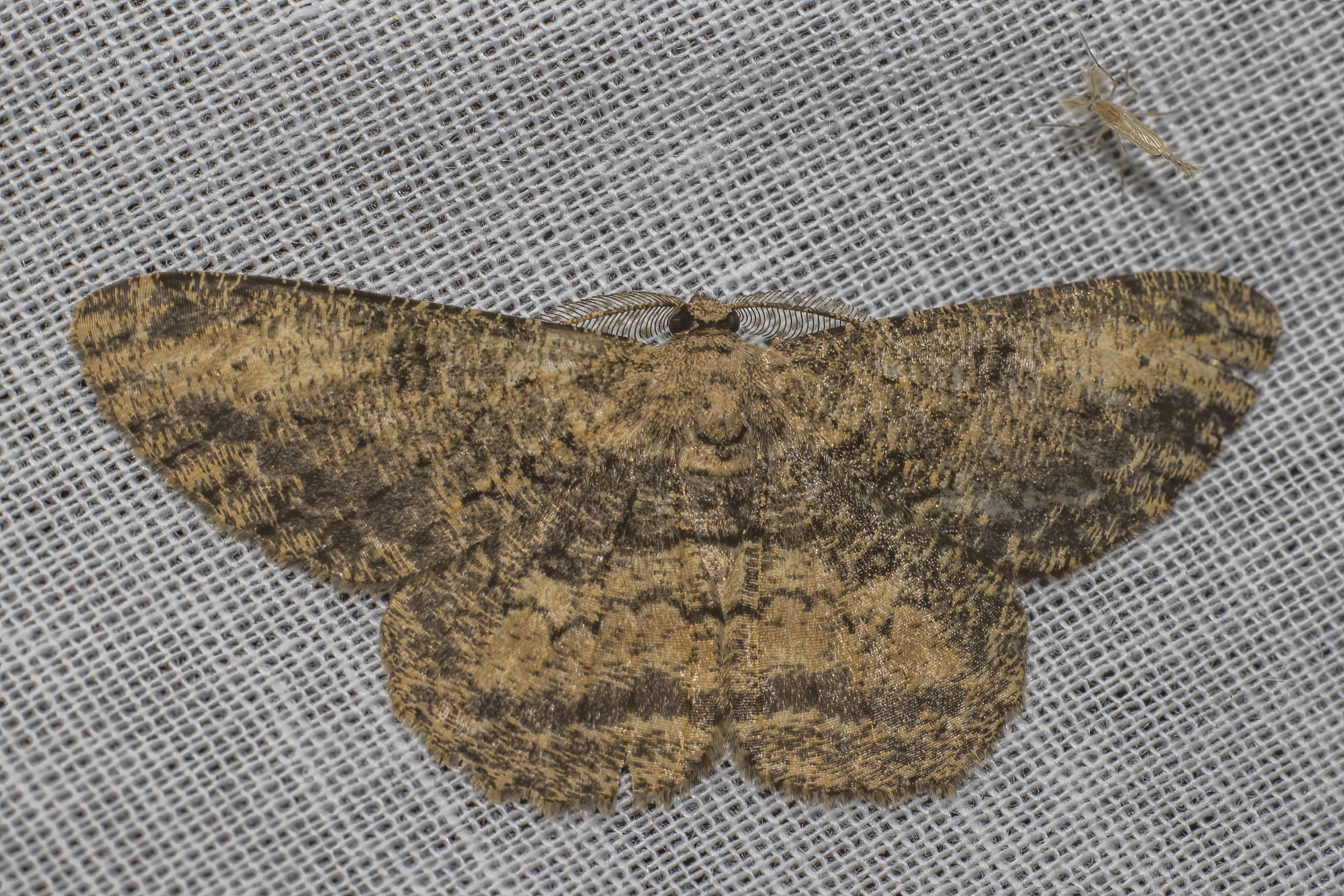
- Gal Oya, Sri Lanks

Scientific classification
- Kingdom: Animalia
- Phylum: Arthropoda
- Class: Insecta
- Order: Lepidoptera
- Family: Geometridae
- Genus: Hypomecis
- Species: H. separata

Binomial name
- Hypomecis separata (Walker 1863)

Synonyms
- Boarmia intectaria Walker, 1860; Boarmia retractaria Walker, 1860; Boarmia miocrota Hampson, 1908

= Hypomecis separata =

Species of moth

Hypomecis separata is a species of moth of the family Geometridae. It was first described by Francis Walker in 1863. It is found in Sri Lanka, India, Java and Borneo.

== Description ==
Its wingspan is about 48 mm. Male without fovea at base of forewings. Hindwings with vein 5 absent. Male with bipectinate (comb-like on both sides) antennae, with decumbent (up-turned tips) branches. Hind tibia usually dilated with a fold and tuft of hair. Males lack secondary sexual patch to hindwings. Forewings with veins 10 and 11 stalked. Male rufous, suffused and striated in parts with black. Forewings of male with a slight ridge representing the fovea. A broad, ill-defined pale fascia found from base to outer margin below apex. The costal, inner and outer areas striated and black suffused. There is an indistinct annulus at end of cell and traces of a waved postmedial line. Hindwings with black striations. Basal area is suffused with fuscous. A crenulate (scalloped) postmedial line and an incomplete submarginal black band can be seen. Ventral side fuscous with prominent cell-spots.
