= Boarmia ceylonaria =

Scientific classification
- Domain: Eukaryota
- Kingdom: Animalia
- Phylum: Arthropoda
- Class: Insecta
- Order: Lepidoptera
- Family: Geometridae
- Genus: Hypomecis
- Species: H. ceylonaria

Binomial name
- Hypomecis ceylonaria Nietner, 1861

Synonyms
- Hypomecis ceylanicaria Nietner, 1861

Species of moth

Boarmia ceylonaria is a moth of the family Geometridae first described by John Nietner in 1861.
