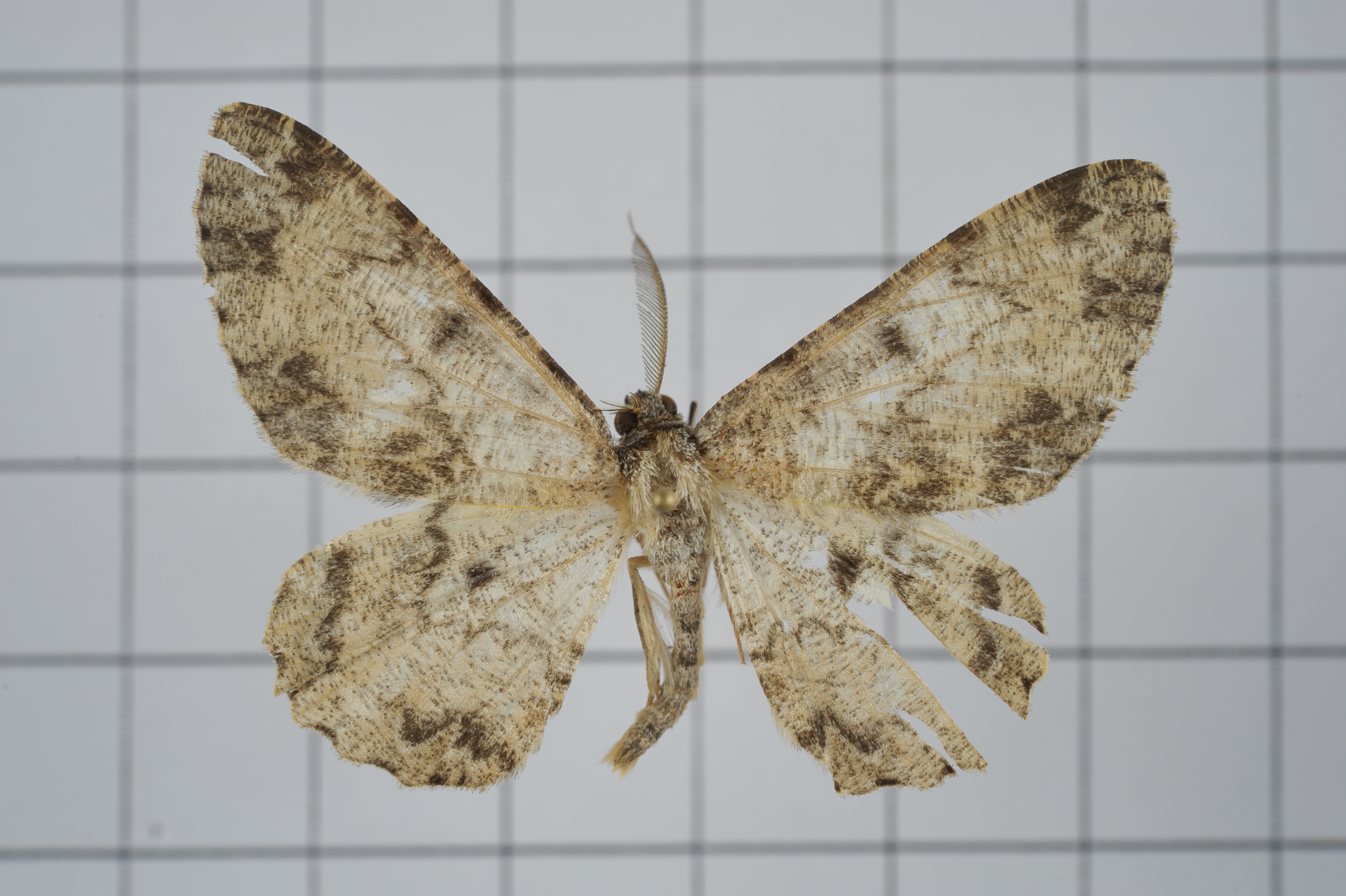

Scientific classification
- Domain: Eukaryota
- Kingdom: Animalia
- Phylum: Arthropoda
- Class: Insecta
- Order: Lepidoptera
- Family: Geometridae
- Genus: Hypomecis
- Species: H. cineracea

Binomial name
- Hypomecis cineracea (Moore, 1888)

= Hypomecis cineracea =

Species of moth

Hypomecis cineracea is a species from the genus Hypomecis.
