= Hypomecis luridula =

Scientific classification
- Kingdom: Animalia
- Phylum: Arthropoda
- Clade: Pancrustacea
- Class: Insecta
- Order: Lepidoptera
- Family: Geometridae
- Genus: Hypomecis
- Species: H. luridula

Binomial name
- Hypomecis luridula (Hulst, 1896)

Species of moth

Hypomecis luridula is a species of geometrid moth in the family Geometridae. It is found in North America.

The MONA or Hodges number for Hypomecis luridula is 6437.
