= Hypomecis gnopharia =

Scientific classification
- Kingdom: Animalia
- Phylum: Arthropoda
- Class: Insecta
- Order: Lepidoptera
- Family: Geometridae
- Tribe: Boarmiini
- Genus: Hypomecis
- Species: H. gnopharia

Binomial name
- Hypomecis gnopharia (Guenée in Boisduval & Guenée, 1858)

Species of moth

Hypomecis gnopharia is a species of geometrid moth in the family Geometridae. It is found in North America.

The MONA or Hodges number for Hypomecis gnopharia is 6440.
