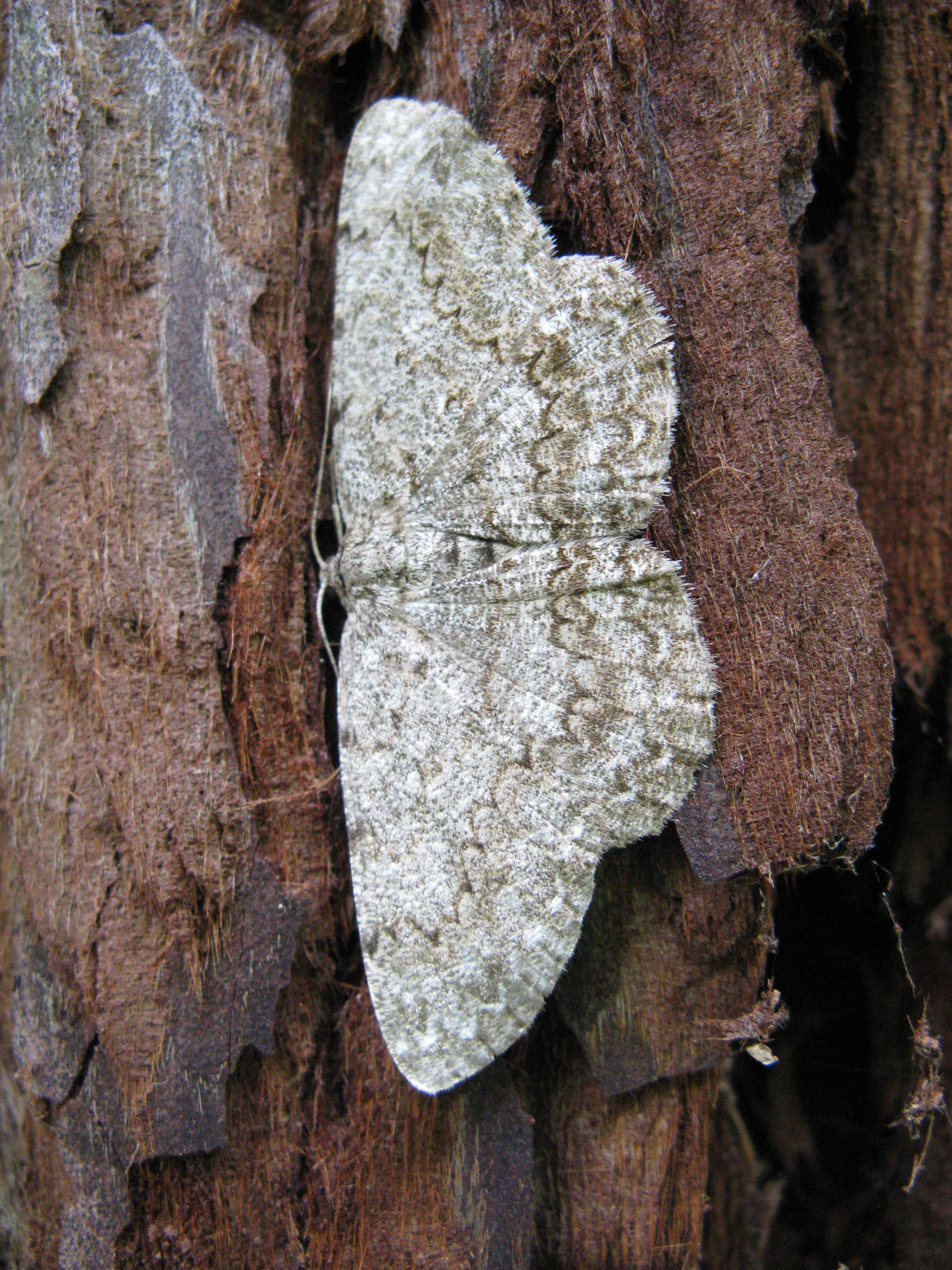

Scientific classification
- Domain: Eukaryota
- Kingdom: Animalia
- Phylum: Arthropoda
- Class: Insecta
- Order: Lepidoptera
- Family: Geometridae
- Genus: Hypomecis
- Species: H. lunifera

Binomial name
- Hypomecis lunifera (Butler, 1879)

= Hypomecis lunifera =

Species of moth

Hypomecis lunifera is a moth of the family Geometridae. It is found in eastern Asia, including Japan, the Kuriles and the Korean Peninsula.

The wingspan is 48–64 mm.
