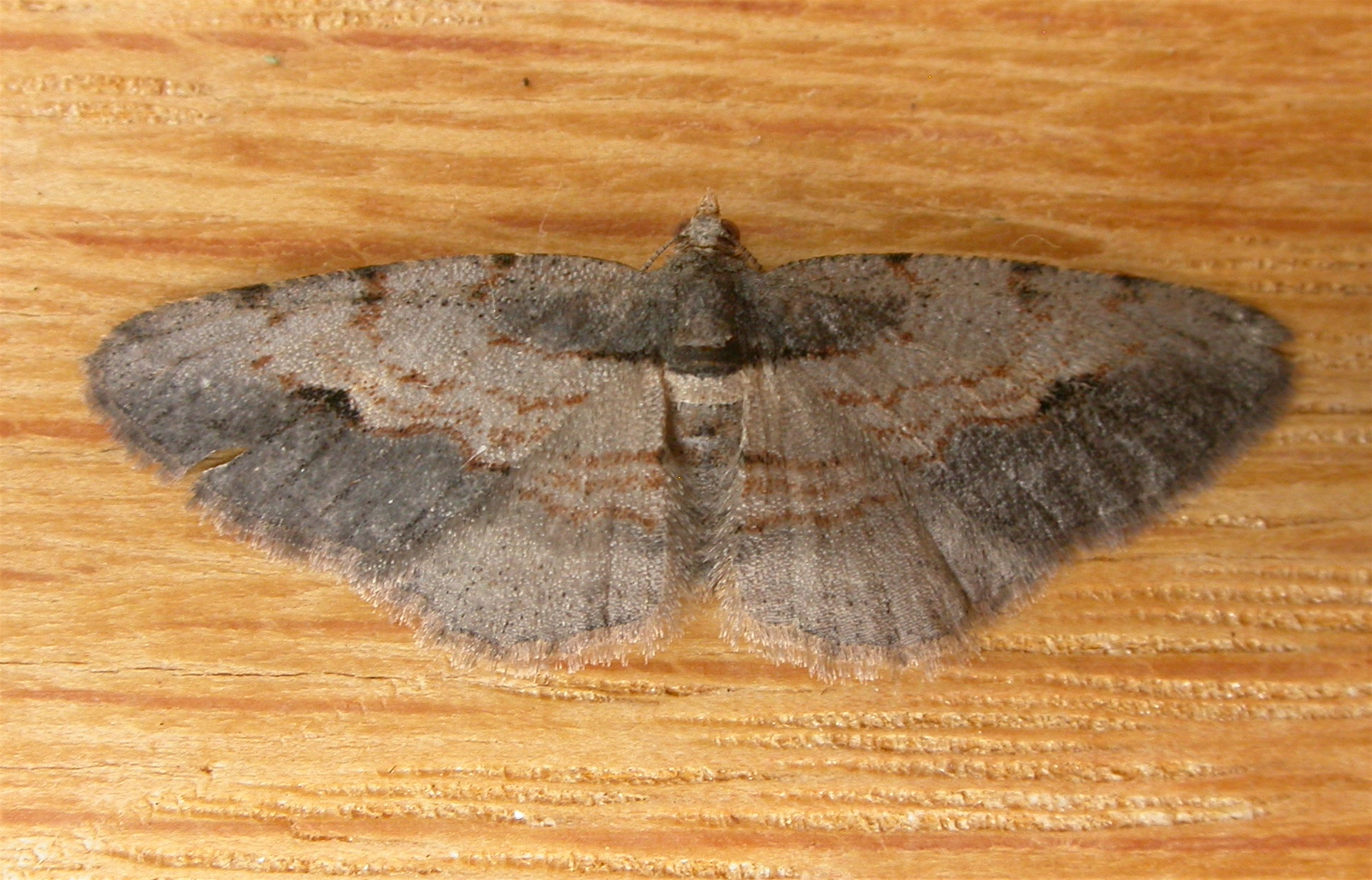

Scientific classification
- Domain: Eukaryota
- Kingdom: Animalia
- Phylum: Arthropoda
- Class: Insecta
- Order: Lepidoptera
- Family: Geometridae
- Genus: Hypomecis
- Species: H. driophila

Binomial name
- Hypomecis driophila Goldfinch, 1944

Synonyms
- Hypomecis driophila Goldfinch, 1944

= Boarmia driophila =

Species of moth

Boarmia driophila is a moth of the family Geometridae first described by G. M. Goldfinch in 1944. It is found in Australia.
