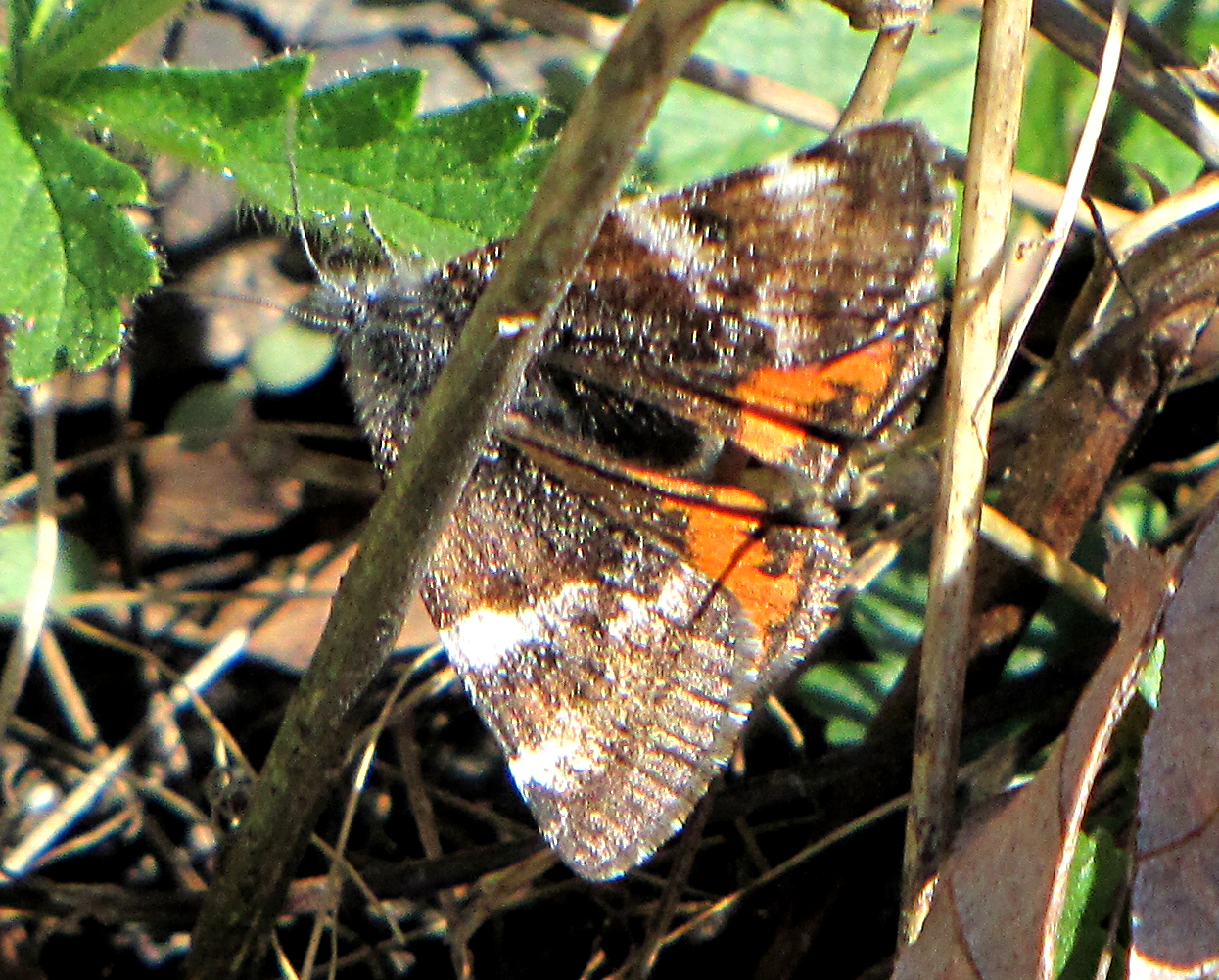
- The infant (Archiearis infans)

Scientific classification
- Kingdom: Animalia
- Phylum: Arthropoda
- Class: Insecta
- Order: Lepidoptera
- Family: Geometridae
- Subfamily: Archiearinae
- Genus: Archiearis; Hübner, [1823]

= Archiearis =

Genus of moths

Archiearis is a genus of moths in the family Geometridae found in northern nearctic and palearctic areas.

== Species ==
- Archiearis infans (Möschler, 1862) – the infant
- Archiearis notha (Hübner, [1803]) – light orange underwing
- Archiearis parthenias (Linnaeus, 1761) – orange underwing
- Archiearis puella (Esper, 1787) – pale orange underwing
- Archiearis touranginii (Berce, 1870)
