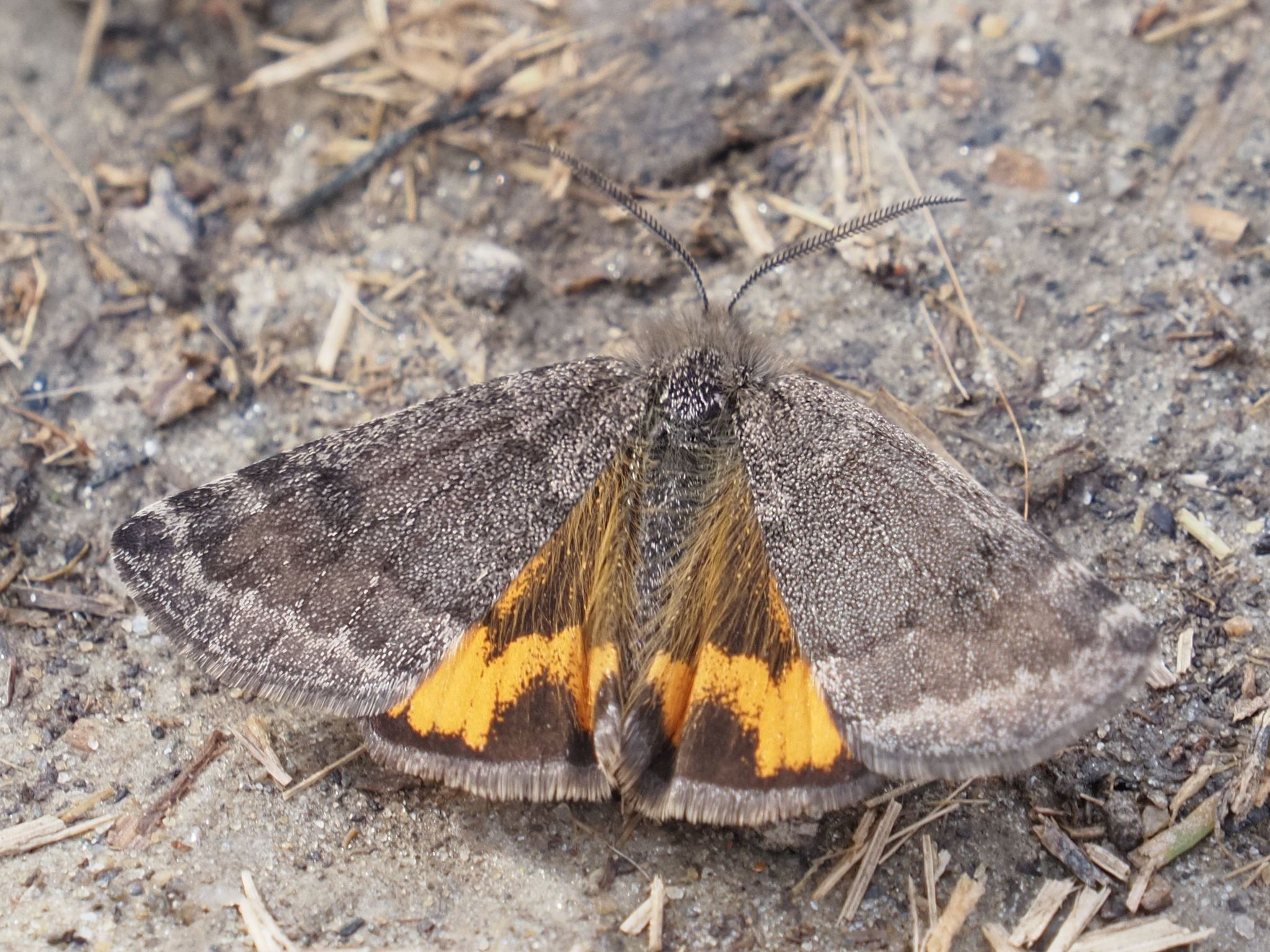
- Boudinotiana notha

Scientific classification
- Kingdom: Animalia
- Phylum: Arthropoda
- Clade: Pancrustacea
- Class: Insecta
- Order: Lepidoptera
- Family: Geometridae
- Subfamily: Archiearinae
- Genus: Boudinotiana; Leraut, 2002

= Boudinotiana =

Genus of moths

Boudinotiana is a genus of geometrid moths in the family Geometridae. There are at least four described species in Boudinotiana.

== Species ==
These four species belong to the genus Boudinotiana:

- Boudinotiana hodeberti Leraut, 2002
- Boudinotiana notha (Hubner, 1803)
- Boudinotiana puella (Esper, 1787)
- Boudinotiana touranginii (Berce, 1870)
