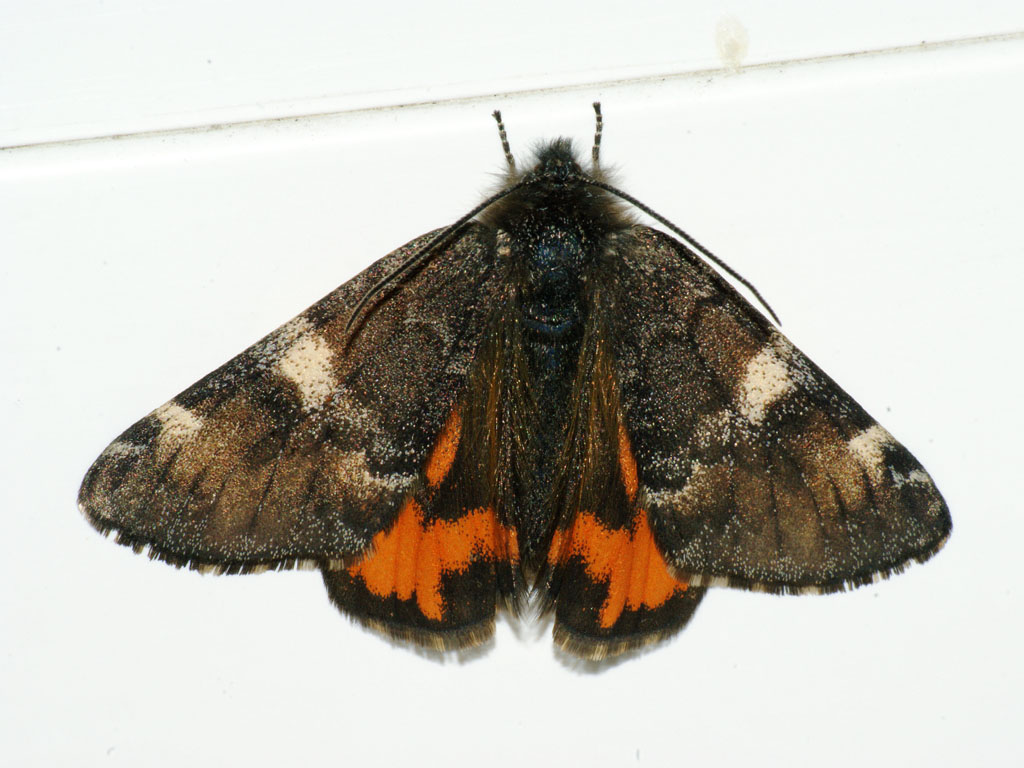

Scientific classification
- Kingdom: Animalia
- Phylum: Arthropoda
- Clade: Pancrustacea
- Class: Insecta
- Order: Lepidoptera
- Family: Geometridae
- Genus: Archiearis
- Species: A. parthenias

Binomial name
- Archiearis parthenias (Linnaeus, 1761)

= Archiearis parthenias =

Orange underwing

Species of moth

Archiearis parthenias, the orange underwing, is a moth of the family Geometridae. The species was first described by Carl Linnaeus in 1761 and can be found in Europe, Russia and Japan.

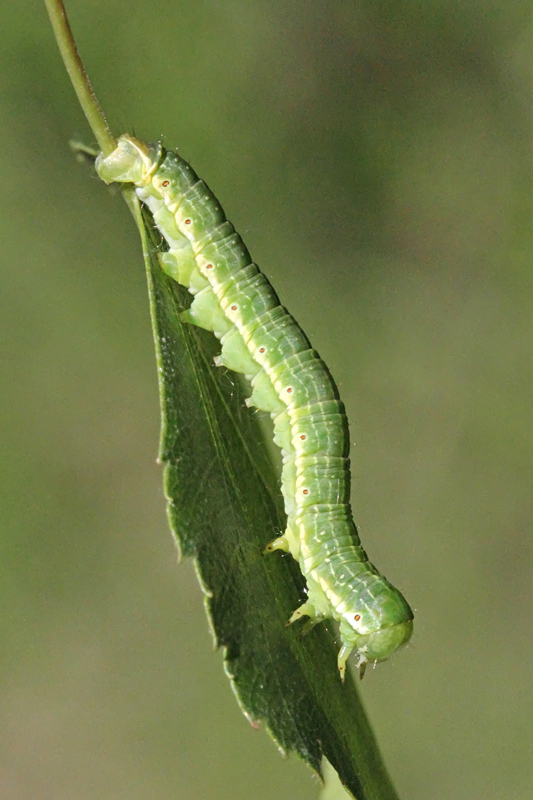
Larva

The wingspan is about 30–40 mm. The moths fly from February to May depending on the location.

The larvae feed first on the catkins and then on the leaves of birch (Betula species).
