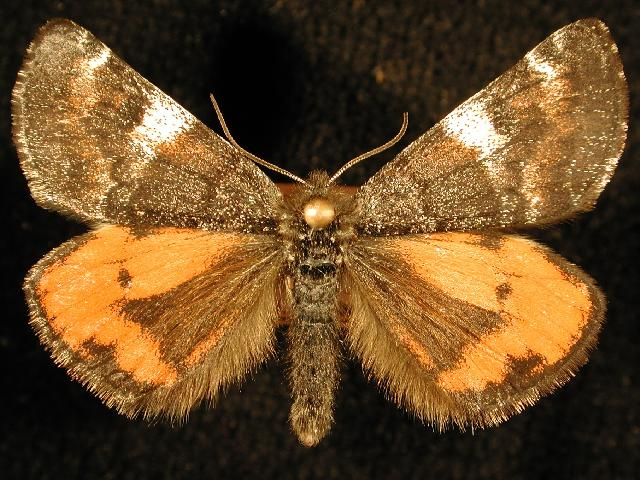

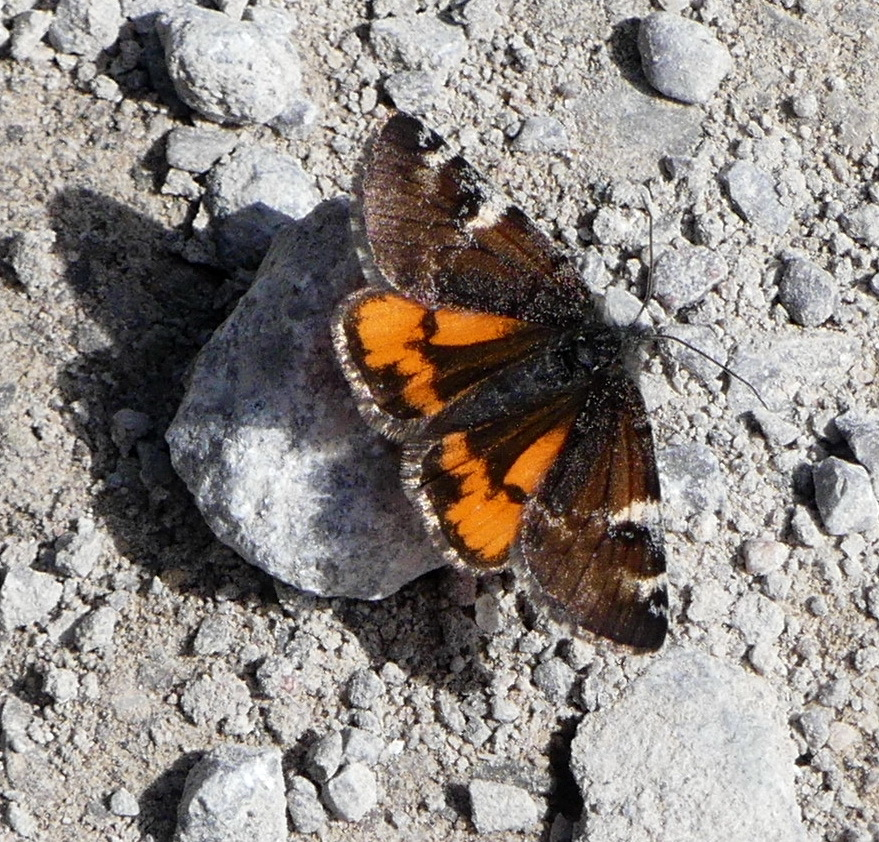

Conservation status
- Secure (NatureServe)

Scientific classification
- Kingdom: Animalia
- Phylum: Arthropoda
- Class: Insecta
- Order: Lepidoptera
- Family: Geometridae
- Genus: Archiearis
- Species: A. infans

Binomial name
- Archiearis infans (Möschler, 1862)

Synonyms
- Brephos infans Möschler, 1862; Brephos hamadryas Harris, 1869; Archiearis origanicus Blackmore

= Archiearis infans =

Infant

Species of moth

Archiearis infans, the infant, is a moth of the family Geometridae. The species was first described by Heinrich Benno Möschler in 1862. It is found from Alaska to Newfoundland and the northern United States, south in the east to New Jersey, south in the west to California.

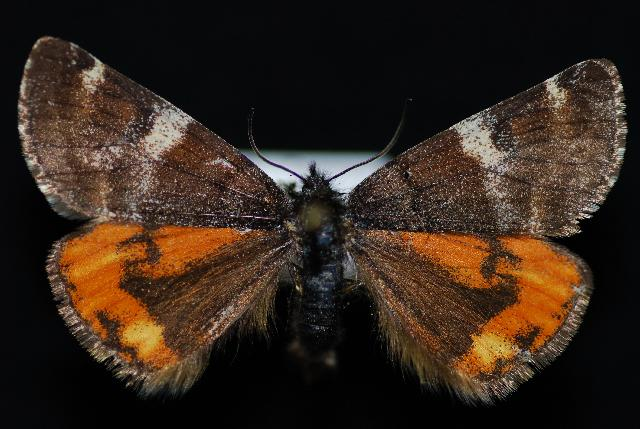
Archiearis infans oregonensis

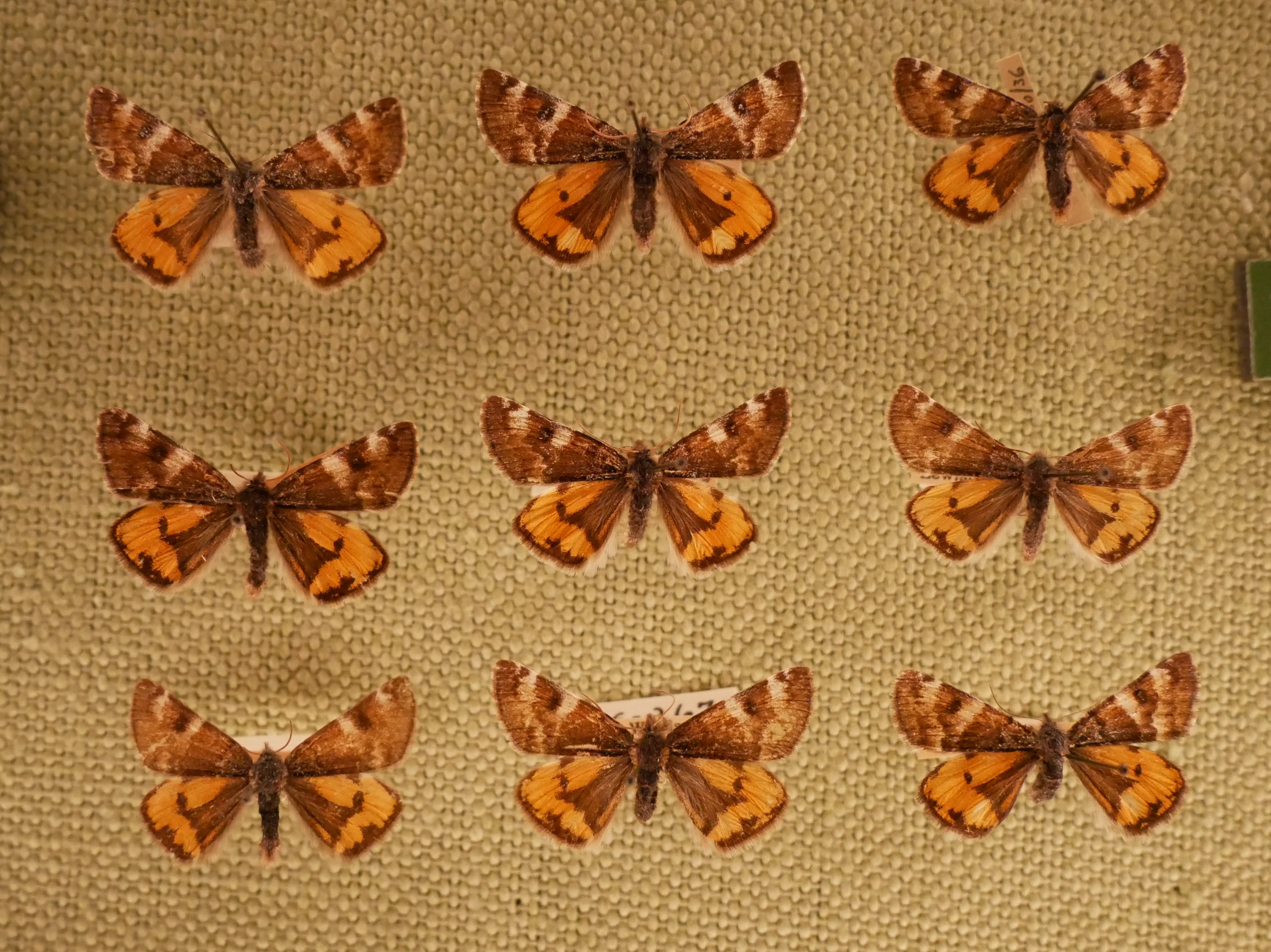
Archiearis infans

== Subspecies ==
- Archiearis infans infans
- Archiearis infans oregonensis (Swett, 1917) (southern British Columbia to California)
