= Boudinotiana hodeberti =

Scientific classification
- Domain: Eukaryota
- Kingdom: Animalia
- Phylum: Arthropoda
- Class: Insecta
- Order: Lepidoptera
- Family: Geometridae
- Genus: Boudinotiana
- Species: B. hodeberti

Binomial name
- Boudinotiana hodeberti Leraut, 2002

Species of moth

Boudinotiana hodeberti is a species of geometrid moth in the family Geometridae. It was described from Asian material that was mistakenly attributed to Labrador (NL) in North America.

The MONA or Hodges number for Boudinotiana hodeberti is 6256.1.
