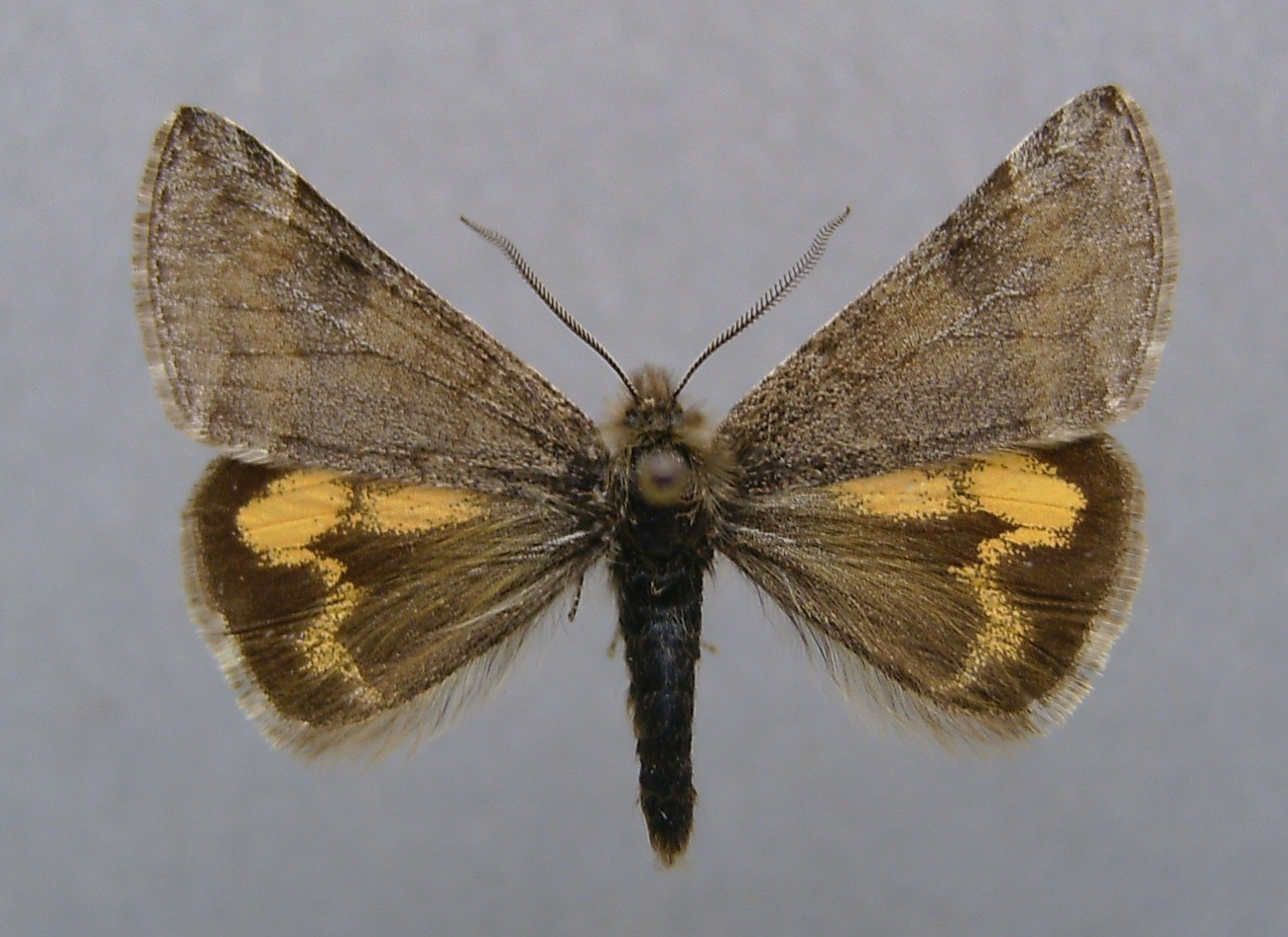

Scientific classification
- Domain: Eukaryota
- Kingdom: Animalia
- Phylum: Arthropoda
- Class: Insecta
- Order: Lepidoptera
- Family: Geometridae
- Genus: Boudinotiana
- Species: B. puella

Binomial name
- Boudinotiana puella (Esper, 1787)

Synonyms
- Phalaena (Noctua) puella Esper, 1787; Archiearis puella; Phalaena (Noctua) caelebs Hübner, 1789; Noctua spuria Hübner, [1803]; Archiearis treitschkei Prout, 1912; Archiearis latevirgata Kitt, 1920; Archiearis inversa Nitsche, 1932; Archiearis puella mediterranea Ganev, 1984

= Boudinotiana puella =

Pale orange underwing

Species of moth

Boudinotiana puella, the pale orange underwing, is a moth of the family Geometridae. The species was first described by Eugen Johann Christoph Esper in 1787. It is found in isolated populations in central Europe, ranging to southern Russia in the east.

The wingspan is 29–34 mm for males and 27–30 mm for females. Adults are on wing from February to April in one generation per year.

The larvae feed on the leaves of Populus species, especially Populus tremula. The larvae can be found from May to June. The species overwinters in the pupal stage.

== Subspecies ==
- Boudinotiana puella puella
- Boudinotiana puella mediterranea (Ganev, 1984) (south-western Bulgaria)
