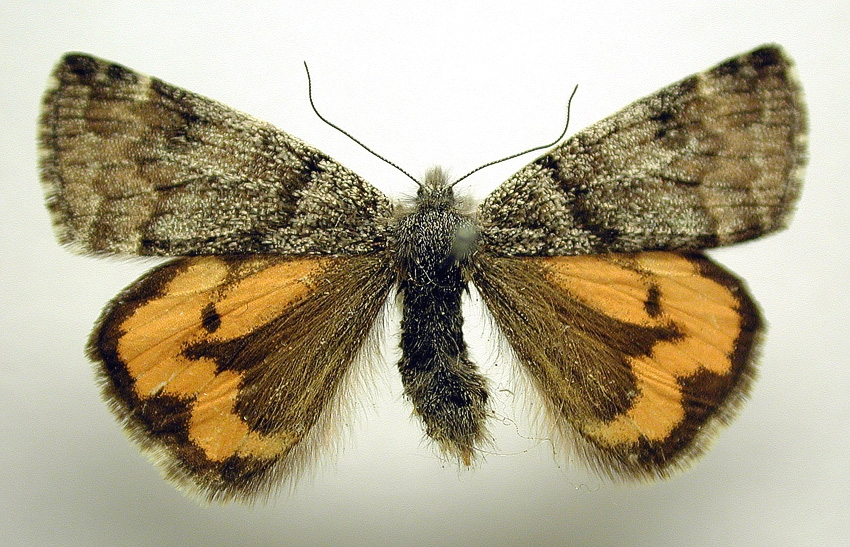

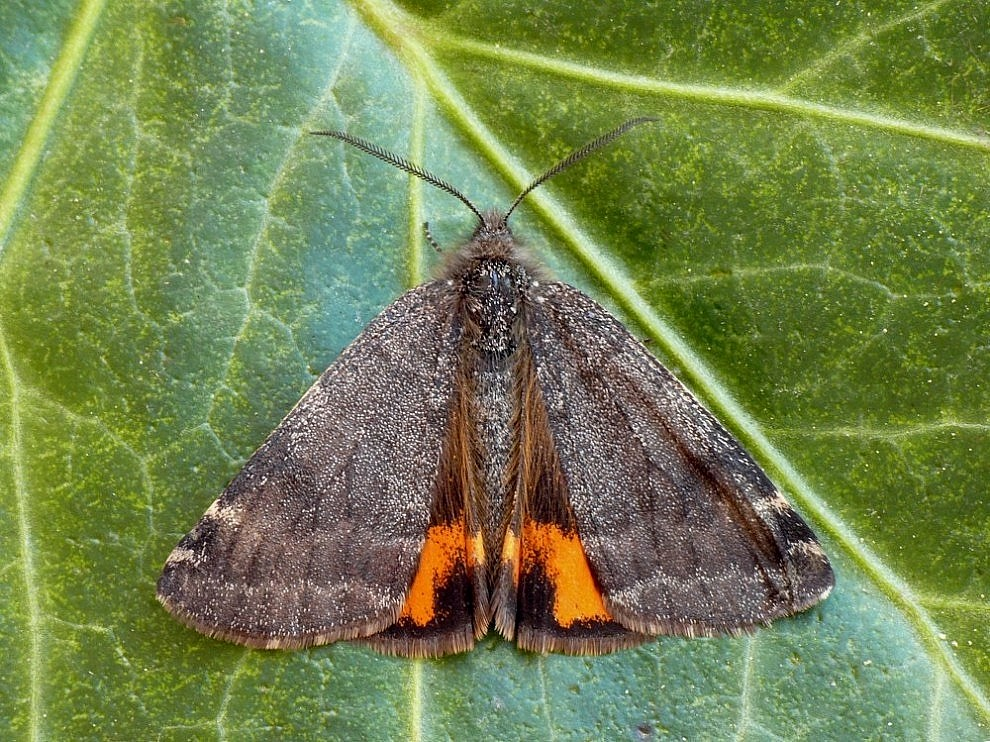

Scientific classification
- Domain: Eukaryota
- Kingdom: Animalia
- Phylum: Arthropoda
- Class: Insecta
- Order: Lepidoptera
- Family: Geometridae
- Genus: Archiearis
- Species: A. notha

Binomial name
- Archiearis notha (Hübner, 1803)

Synonyms
- Noctua notha Hübner, [1803]; Boudinotiana notha (Hübner, [1803])

= Archiearis notha =

Light orange underwing

Species of moth

Archiearis notha, the light orange underwing, is a moth of the family Geometridae. The species was first described by Jacob Hübner in 1803 and can be found in Europe.

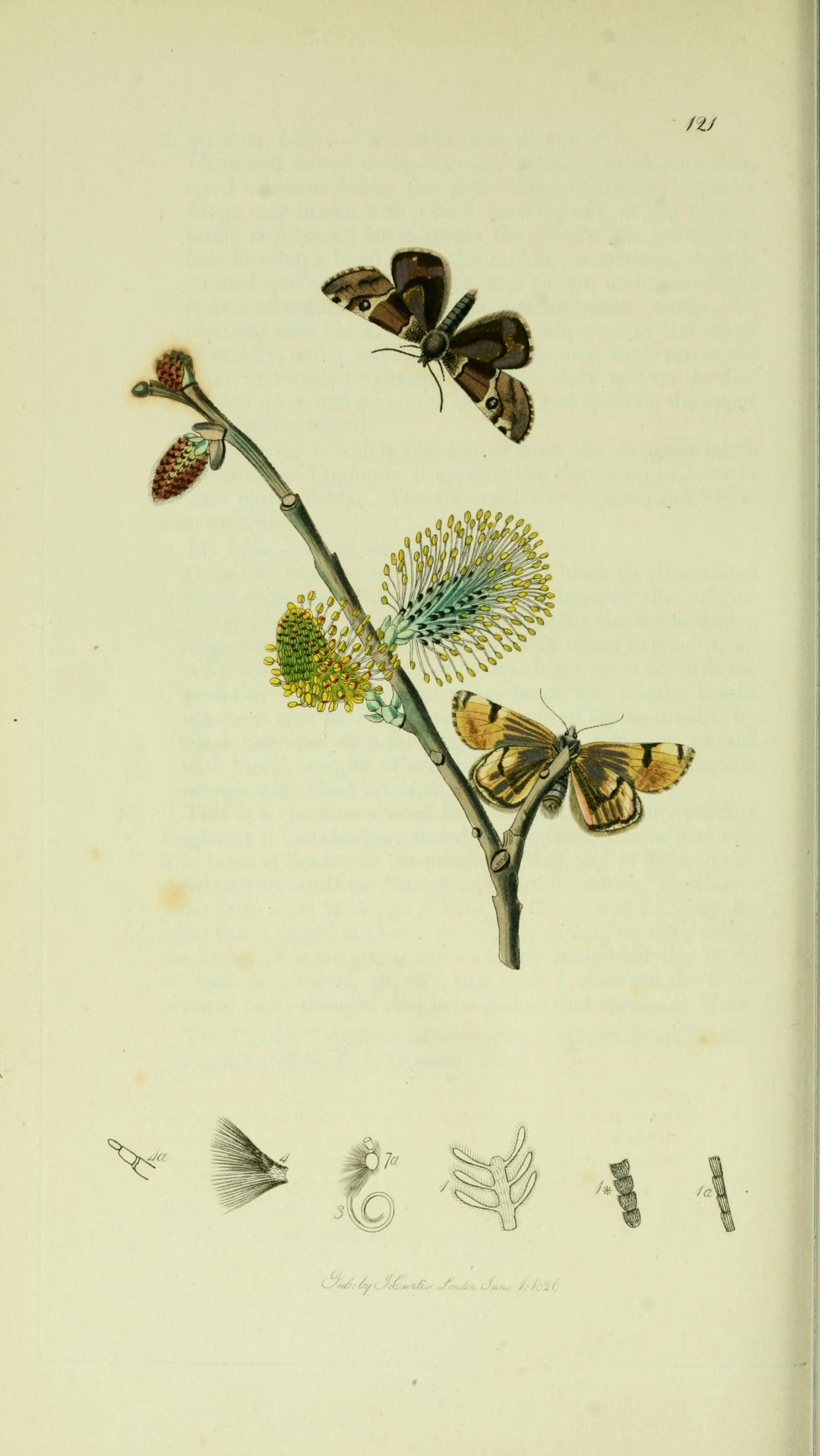
Illustration from John Curtis's British Entomology Volume 5

The wingspan is about 35 mm. The moths fly from March to April depending on the location.

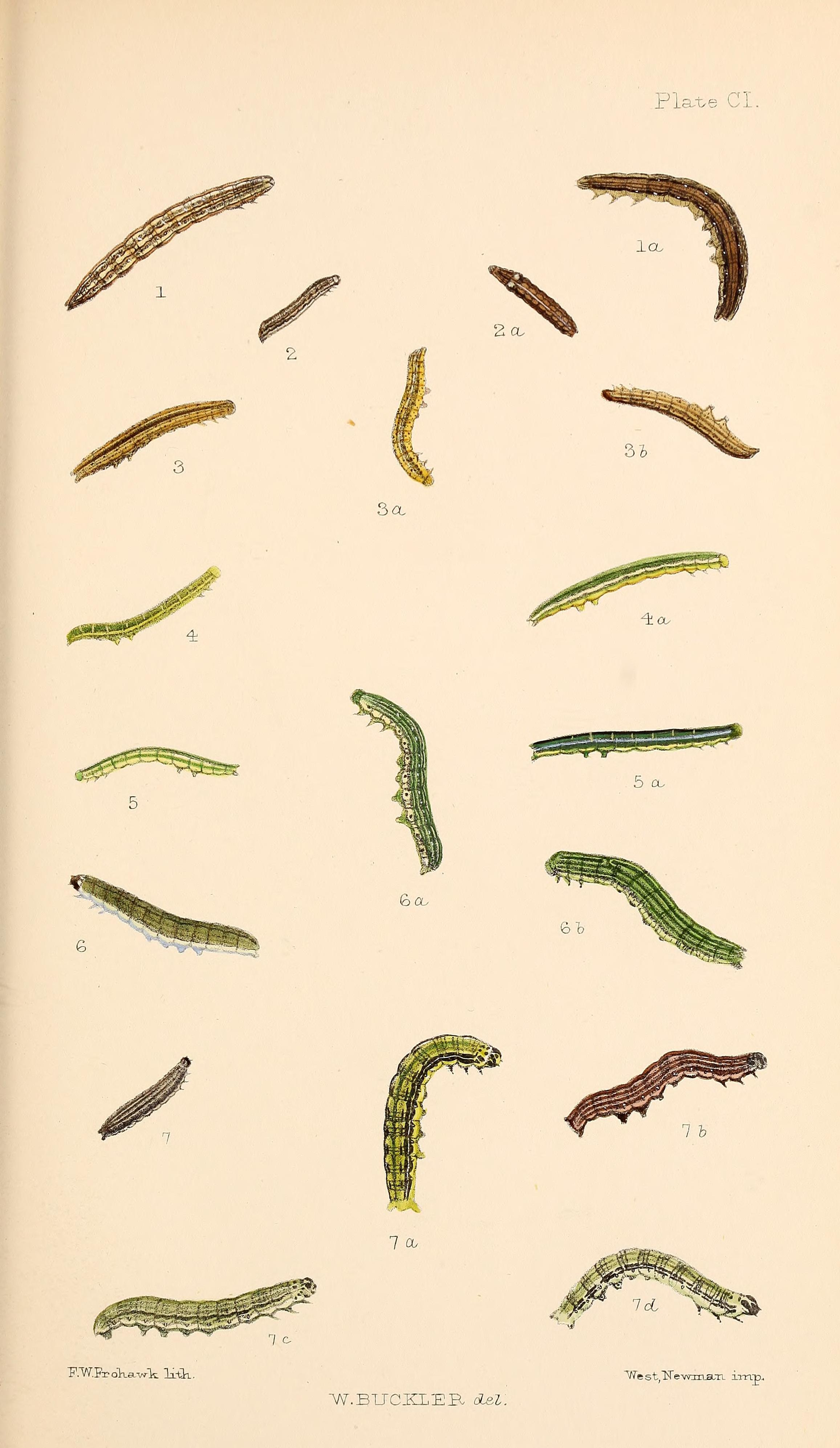
7, 7a, 7b ,7c, 7d larvae in various stages of growth

The larvae feed on aspen (Populus tremula), hiding between spun leaves during the day.
