= List of moths of Metropolitan France (I–O) =

Partial list of moths in Metropolitan France

This is a list of moths of families starting from I to O that are found in Metropolitan France (including Corsica). It also acts as an index to the species articles and forms part of the full List of Lepidoptera of Metropolitan France.

== Family Incurvariidae ==
- Alloclemensia mesospilella (Herrich-Schaffer, 1854)
- Crinopteryx familiella Peyerimhoff, 1871
- Incurvaria koerneriella (Zeller, 1839)
- Incurvaria masculella (Denis & Schiffermuller, 1775)
- Incurvaria oehlmanniella (Hübner, 1796)
- Incurvaria pectinea Haworth, 1828
- Incurvaria ploessli Huemer, 1993
- Incurvaria praelatella (Denis & Schiffermuller, 1775)
- Paraclemensia cyanella (Zeller, 1850)
- Phylloporia bistrigella (Haworth, 1828)

== Family Lasiocampidae ==
- Cosmotriche lobulina (Denis & Schiffermuller, 1775)
- Dendrolimus pini (Linnaeus, 1758)
- Eriogaster arbusculae Freyer, 1849
- Eriogaster catax (Linnaeus, 1758)
- Eriogaster lanestris (Linnaeus, 1758)
- Eriogaster rimicola (Denis & Schiffermuller, 1775)
- Euthrix potatoria (Linnaeus, 1758)
- Gastropacha quercifolia (Linnaeus, 1758)
- Gastropacha populifolia (Denis & Schiffermuller, 1775)
- Lasiocampa quercus (Linnaeus, 1758)
- Lasiocampa trifolii (Denis & Schiffermuller, 1775)
- Macrothylacia rubi (Linnaeus, 1758)
- Malacosoma castrensis (Linnaeus, 1758)
- Malacosoma neustria (Linnaeus, 1758)
- Malacosoma alpicola Staudinger, 1870
- Malacosoma franconica (Denis & Schiffermuller, 1775)
- Odonestis pruni (Linnaeus, 1758)
- Pachypasa limosa (de Villiers, 1827)
- Phyllodesma suberifolia (Duponchel, 1842)
- Phyllodesma ilicifolia (Linnaeus, 1758)
- Phyllodesma kermesifolia (Lajonquiere, 1960)
- Phyllodesma tremulifolia (Hübner, 1810)
- Poecilocampa alpina (Frey & Wullschlegel, 1874)
- Poecilocampa populi (Linnaeus, 1758)
- Psilogaster loti (Ochsenheimer, 1810)
- Trichiura ilicis (Rambur, 1866)
- Trichiura castiliana Spuler, 1908
- Trichiura crataegi (Linnaeus, 1758)

== Family Lecithoceridae ==
- Eurodachtha canigella (Caradja, 1920)
- Eurodachtha pallicornella (Staudinger, 1859)
- Eurodachtha siculella (Wocke, 1889)
- Homaloxestis briantiella (Turati, 1879)
- Lecithocera anatolica Gozmany, 1978
- Lecithocera nigrana (Duponchel, 1836)
- Odites kollarella (O. G. Costa, 1832)

== Family Limacodidae ==
- Apoda limacodes (Hufnagel, 1766)
- Heterogenea asella (Denis & Schiffermuller, 1775)
- Hoyosia codeti (Oberthur, 1883)

== Family Lyonetiidae ==
- Leucoptera aceris (Fuchs, 1903)
- Leucoptera calycotomella Amsel, 1939
- Leucoptera coronillae (M. Hering, 1933)
- Leucoptera genistae (M. Hering, 1933)
- Leucoptera laburnella (Stainton, 1851)
- Leucoptera lotella (Stainton, 1859)
- Leucoptera lustratella (Herrich-Schaffer, 1855)
- Leucoptera malifoliella (O. Costa, 1836)
- Leucoptera onobrychidella Klimesch, 1937
- Leucoptera sinuella (Reutti, 1853)
- Leucoptera spartifoliella (Hübner, 1813)
- Leucoptera zanclaeella (Zeller, 1848)
- Lyonetia clerkella (Linnaeus, 1758)
- Lyonetia ledi Wocke, 1859
- Lyonetia prunifoliella (Hübner, 1796)
- Phyllobrostis daphneella Staudinger, 1859
- Phyllobrostis eremitella de Joannis, 1912
- Phyllobrostis fregenella Hartig, 1941
- Phyllobrostis hartmanni Staudinger, 1867

== Family Lypusidae ==
- Amphisbatis incongruella (Stainton, 1849)
- Lypusa maurella (Denis & Schiffermuller, 1775)
- Pseudatemelia colurnella (Mann, 1867)
- Pseudatemelia filiella (Staudinger, 1859)
- Pseudatemelia flavifrontella (Denis & Schiffermuller, 1775)
- Pseudatemelia fuscifrontella (Constant, 1885)
- Pseudatemelia latipennella (Jackh, 1959)
- Pseudatemelia lavandulae (Mann, 1855)
- Pseudatemelia subgilvida (Walsingham, 1901)
- Pseudatemelia subochreella (Doubleday, 1859)
- Pseudatemelia synchrozella (Jackh, 1959)
- Pseudatemelia josephinae (Toll, 1956)
- Pseudatemelia langohri E. Palm, 1990

== Family Micropterigidae ==
- Micropterix aglaella (Duponchel, 1838)
- Micropterix allionella (Fabricius, 1794)
- Micropterix aruncella (Scopoli, 1763)
- Micropterix aureatella (Scopoli, 1763)
- Micropterix aureoviridella (Hofner, 1898)
- Micropterix calthella (Linnaeus, 1761)
- Micropterix huemeri M. A. Kurz, M. E. Kurz & Zeller-Lukashort, 2003
- Micropterix mansuetella Zeller, 1844
- Micropterix osthelderi Heath, 1975
- Micropterix paykullella (Fabricius, 1794)
- Micropterix rothenbachii Frey, 1856
- Micropterix schaefferi Heath, 1975
- Micropterix sicanella Zeller, 1847
- Micropterix trifasciella Heath, 1965
- Micropterix tunbergella (Fabricius, 1787)

== Family Millieridae ==
- Millieria dolosalis (Heydenreich, 1851)

== Family Momphidae ==
- Mompha langiella (Hübner, 1796)
- Mompha idaei (Zeller, 1839)
- Mompha miscella (Denis & Schiffermuller, 1775)
- Mompha bradleyi Riedl, 1965
- Mompha conturbatella (Hübner, 1819)
- Mompha divisella Herrich-Schaffer, 1854
- Mompha epilobiella (Denis & Schiffermuller, 1775)
- Mompha jurassicella (Frey, 1881)
- Mompha lacteella (Stephens, 1834)
- Mompha ochraceella (Curtis, 1839)
- Mompha propinquella (Stainton, 1851)
- Mompha sturnipennella (Treitschke, 1833)
- Mompha subbistrigella (Haworth, 1828)
- Mompha locupletella (Denis & Schiffermuller, 1775)
- Mompha raschkiella (Zeller, 1839)
- Mompha terminella (Humphreys & Westwood, 1845)
- Urodeta hibernella (Staudinger, 1859)

== Family Nepticulidae ==
- Acalyptris minimella (Rebel, 1924)
- Acalyptris platani (Muller-Rutz, 1934)
- Bohemannia auriciliella (de Joannis, 1908)
- Bohemannia pulverosella (Stainton, 1849)
- Bohemannia quadrimaculella (Boheman, 1853)
- Ectoedemia agrimoniae (Frey, 1858)
- Ectoedemia albifasciella (Heinemann, 1871)
- Ectoedemia algeriensis van Nieukerken, 1985
- Ectoedemia andalusiae van Nieukerken, 1985
- Ectoedemia angulifasciella (Stainton, 1849)
- Ectoedemia arcuatella (Herrich-Schaffer, 1855)
- Ectoedemia argyropeza (Zeller, 1839)
- Ectoedemia atricollis (Stainton, 1857)
- Ectoedemia caradjai (Groschke, 1944)
- Ectoedemia erythrogenella (de Joannis, 1908)
- Ectoedemia hannoverella (Glitz, 1872)
- Ectoedemia haraldi (Soffner, 1942)
- Ectoedemia hendrikseni A.Lastuvka, Z. Lastuvka & van Nieukerken, 2010
- Ectoedemia heringella (Mariani, 1939)
- Ectoedemia heringi (Toll, 1934)
- Ectoedemia hexapetalae (Szocs, 1957)
- Ectoedemia ilicis (Mendes, 1910)
- Ectoedemia intimella (Zeller, 1848)
- Ectoedemia mahalebella (Klimesch, 1936)
- Ectoedemia minimella (Zetterstedt, 1839)
- Ectoedemia occultella (Linnaeus, 1767)
- Ectoedemia pubescivora (Weber, 1937)
- Ectoedemia quinquella (Bedell, 1848)
- Ectoedemia rosae Van Nieukerken, 2011
- Ectoedemia rubivora (Wocke, 1860)
- Ectoedemia rufifrontella (Caradja, 1920)
- Ectoedemia spinosella (de Joannis, 1908)
- Ectoedemia subbimaculella (Haworth, 1828)
- Ectoedemia suberis (Stainton, 1869)
- Ectoedemia turbidella (Zeller, 1848)
- Ectoedemia decentella (Herrich-Schaffer, 1855)
- Ectoedemia louisella (Sircom, 1849)
- Ectoedemia obtusa (Puplesis & Diskus, 1996)
- Ectoedemia sericopeza (Zeller, 1839)
- Ectoedemia euphorbiella (Stainton, 1869)
- Ectoedemia septembrella (Stainton, 1849)
- Ectoedemia weaveri (Stainton, 1855)
- Ectoedemia amani Svensson, 1966
- Ectoedemia atrifrontella (Stainton, 1851)
- Ectoedemia hispanica van Nieukerken, 1985
- Ectoedemia liebwerdella Zimmermann, 1940
- Ectoedemia liguricella Klimesch, 1953
- Ectoedemia longicaudella Klimesch, 1953
- Enteucha acetosae (Stainton, 1854)
- Parafomoria cistivora (Peyerimhoff, 1871)
- Parafomoria fumanae A. & Z. Lastuvka, 2005
- Parafomoria halimivora van Nieukerken, 1985
- Parafomoria helianthemella (Herrich-Schaffer, 1860)
- Parafomoria liguricella (Klimesch, 1946)
- Parafomoria pseudocistivora van Nieukerken, 1983
- Simplimorpha promissa (Staudinger, 1871)
- Stigmella aceris (Frey, 1857)
- Stigmella aeneofasciella (Herrich-Schaffer, 1855)
- Stigmella alaternella (Le Marchand, 1937)
- Stigmella alnetella (Stainton, 1856)
- Stigmella anomalella (Goeze, 1783)
- Stigmella assimilella (Zeller, 1848)
- Stigmella atricapitella (Haworth, 1828)
- Stigmella aurella (Fabricius, 1775)
- Stigmella auromarginella (Richardson, 1890)
- Stigmella basiguttella (Heinemann, 1862)
- Stigmella betulicola (Stainton, 1856)
- Stigmella carpinella (Heinemann, 1862)
- Stigmella catharticella (Stainton, 1853)
- Stigmella centifoliella (Zeller, 1848)
- Stigmella confusella (Wood & Walsingham, 1894)
- Stigmella continuella (Stainton, 1856)
- Stigmella crataegella (Klimesch, 1936)
- Stigmella desperatella (Frey, 1856)
- Stigmella diniensis (Klimesch, 1975)
- Stigmella dorsiguttella (Johansson, 1971)
- Stigmella dryadella (O. Hofmann, 1868)
- Stigmella eberhardi (Johansson, 1971)
- Stigmella floslactella (Haworth, 1828)
- Stigmella freyella (Heyden, 1858)
- Stigmella glutinosae (Stainton, 1858)
- Stigmella hemargyrella (Kollar, 1832)
- Stigmella hybnerella (Hübner, 1796)
- Stigmella ilicifoliella (Mendes, 1918)
- Stigmella incognitella (Herrich-Schaffer, 1855)
- Stigmella lapponica (Wocke, 1862)
- Stigmella lemniscella (Zeller, 1839)
- Stigmella lonicerarum (Frey, 1856)
- Stigmella luteella (Stainton, 1857)
- Stigmella magdalenae (Klimesch, 1950)
- Stigmella malella (Stainton, 1854)
- Stigmella mespilicola (Frey, 1856)
- Stigmella microtheriella (Stainton, 1854)
- Stigmella minusculella (Herrich-Schaffer, 1855)
- Stigmella myrtillella (Stainton, 1857)
- Stigmella nylandriella (Tengstrom, 1848)
- Stigmella obliquella (Heinemann, 1862)
- Stigmella oxyacanthella (Stainton, 1854)
- Stigmella paradoxa (Frey, 1858)
- Stigmella perpygmaeella (Doubleday, 1859)
- Stigmella plagicolella (Stainton, 1854)
- Stigmella prunetorum (Stainton, 1855)
- Stigmella pyri (Glitz, 1865)
- Stigmella regiella (Herrich-Schaffer, 1855)
- Stigmella rhamnella (Herrich-Schaffer, 1860)
- Stigmella roborella (Johansson, 1971)
- Stigmella rolandi van Nieukerken, 1990
- Stigmella ruficapitella (Haworth, 1828)
- Stigmella sakhalinella Puplesis, 1984
- Stigmella salicis (Stainton, 1854)
- Stigmella samiatella (Zeller, 1839)
- Stigmella sorbi (Stainton, 1861)
- Stigmella speciosa (Frey, 1858)
- Stigmella splendidissimella (Herrich-Schaffer, 1855)
- Stigmella stelviana (Weber, 1938)
- Stigmella suberivora (Stainton, 1869)
- Stigmella svenssoni (Johansson, 1971)
- Stigmella thuringiaca (Petry, 1904)
- Stigmella tiliae (Frey, 1856)
- Stigmella tityrella (Stainton, 1854)
- Stigmella tormentillella (Herrich-Schaffer, 1860)
- Stigmella trimaculella (Haworth, 1828)
- Stigmella ulmivora (Fologne, 1860)
- Stigmella vimineticola (Frey, 1856)
- Stigmella viscerella (Stainton, 1853)
- Stigmella zangherii (Klimesch, 1951)
- Trifurcula alypella Klimesch, 1975
- Trifurcula bleonella (Chretien, 1904)
- Trifurcula bupleurella (Chretien, 1907)
- Trifurcula headleyella (Stainton, 1854)
- Trifurcula lavandulae Z. & A. Lastuvka, 2007
- Trifurcula magna A. & Z. Lastuvka, 1997
- Trifurcula melanoptera van Nieukerken & Puplesis, 1991
- Trifurcula rosmarinella (Chretien, 1914)
- Trifurcula saturejae (Parenti, 1963)
- Trifurcula stoechadella Klimesch, 1975
- Trifurcula teucriella (Chretien, 1914)
- Trifurcula thymi (Szocs, 1965)
- Trifurcula cryptella (Stainton, 1856)
- Trifurcula eurema (Tutt, 1899)
- Trifurcula ortneri (Klimesch, 1951)
- Trifurcula aurella Rebel, 1933
- Trifurcula calycotomella A. & Z. Lastuvka, 1997
- Trifurcula coronillae van Nieukerken, 1990
- Trifurcula immundella (Zeller, 1839)
- Trifurcula josefklimeschi van Nieukerken, 1990
- Trifurcula luteola van Nieukerken, 1990
- Trifurcula orientella Klimesch, 1953
- Trifurcula pallidella (Duponchel, 1843)
- Trifurcula serotinella Herrich-Schaffer, 1855
- Trifurcula silviae van Nieukerken, 1990
- Trifurcula squamatella Stainton, 1849
- Trifurcula subnitidella (Duponchel, 1843)

== Family Noctuidae ==
- Abrostola agnorista Dufay, 1956
- Abrostola asclepiadis (Denis & Schiffermuller, 1775)
- Abrostola tripartita (Hufnagel, 1766)
- Abrostola triplasia (Linnaeus, 1758)
- Acontia lucida (Hufnagel, 1766)
- Acontia trabealis (Scopoli, 1763)
- Acontia viridisquama Guenee, 1852
- Acosmetia caliginosa (Hübner, 1813)
- Acronicta aceris (Linnaeus, 1758)
- Acronicta leporina (Linnaeus, 1758)
- Acronicta strigosa (Denis & Schiffermuller, 1775)
- Acronicta alni (Linnaeus, 1767)
- Acronicta cuspis (Hübner, 1813)
- Acronicta psi (Linnaeus, 1758)
- Acronicta tridens (Denis & Schiffermuller, 1775)
- Acronicta auricoma (Denis & Schiffermuller, 1775)
- Acronicta euphorbiae (Denis & Schiffermuller, 1775)
- Acronicta menyanthidis (Esper, 1789)
- Acronicta rumicis (Linnaeus, 1758)
- Actebia praecox (Linnaeus, 1758)
- Actebia fugax (Treitschke, 1825)
- Actinotia polyodon (Clerck, 1759)
- Actinotia radiosa (Esper, 1804)
- Aedia funesta (Esper, 1786)
- Aedia leucomelas (Linnaeus, 1758)
- Agrochola lychnidis (Denis & Schiffermuller, 1775)
- Agrochola helvola (Linnaeus, 1758)
- Agrochola humilis (Denis & Schiffermuller, 1775)
- Agrochola litura (Linnaeus, 1758)
- Agrochola meridionalis (Staudinger, 1871)
- Agrochola nitida (Denis & Schiffermuller, 1775)
- Agrochola pistacinoides (d'Aubuisson, 1867)
- Agrochola haematidea (Duponchel, 1827)
- Agrochola blidaensis (Stertz, 1915)
- Agrochola lota (Clerck, 1759)
- Agrochola macilenta (Hübner, 1809)
- Agrochola laevis (Hübner, 1803)
- Agrochola circellaris (Hufnagel, 1766)
- Agrotis alexandriensis Baker, 1894
- Agrotis bigramma (Esper, 1790)
- Agrotis catalaunensis (Milliere, 1873)
- Agrotis chretieni (Dumont, 1903)
- Agrotis cinerea (Denis & Schiffermuller, 1775)
- Agrotis clavis (Hufnagel, 1766)
- Agrotis endogaea Boisduval, 1834
- Agrotis exclamationis (Linnaeus, 1758)
- Agrotis fatidica (Hübner, 1824)
- Agrotis graslini Rambur, 1848
- Agrotis ipsilon (Hufnagel, 1766)
- Agrotis obesa Boisduval, 1829
- Agrotis puta (Hübner, 1803)
- Agrotis ripae Hübner, 1823
- Agrotis schawerdai Bytinski-Salz, 1937
- Agrotis segetum (Denis & Schiffermuller, 1775)
- Agrotis simplonia (Geyer, 1832)
- Agrotis spinifera (Hübner, 1808)
- Agrotis trux (Hübner, 1824)
- Agrotis turatii Standfuss, 1888
- Agrotis vestigialis (Hufnagel, 1766)
- Allophyes corsica (Spuler, 1905)
- Allophyes oxyacanthae (Linnaeus, 1758)
- Alvaradoia disjecta (Rothschild, 1920)
- Alvaradoia numerica (Boisduval, 1840)
- Amephana anarrhini (Duponchel, 1840)
- Amephana aurita (Fabricius, 1787)
- Ammoconia caecimacula (Denis & Schiffermuller, 1775)
- Ammoconia senex (Geyer, 1828)
- Ammopolia witzenmanni (Standfuss, 1890)
- Amphipoea fucosa (Freyer, 1830)
- Amphipoea lucens (Freyer, 1845)
- Amphipoea oculea (Linnaeus, 1761)
- Amphipyra berbera Rungs, 1949
- Amphipyra effusa Boisduval, 1828
- Amphipyra livida (Denis & Schiffermuller, 1775)
- Amphipyra perflua (Fabricius, 1787)
- Amphipyra pyramidea (Linnaeus, 1758)
- Amphipyra tetra (Fabricius, 1787)
- Amphipyra tragopoginis (Clerck, 1759)
- Amphipyra cinnamomea (Goeze, 1781)
- Anaplectoides prasina (Denis & Schiffermuller, 1775)
- Anarta myrtilli (Linnaeus, 1761)
- Anarta odontites (Boisduval, 1829)
- Anarta pugnax (Hübner, 1824)
- Anarta sodae (Rambur, 1829)
- Anarta stigmosa (Christoph, 1887)
- Anarta trifolii (Hufnagel, 1766)
- Anorthoa munda (Denis & Schiffermuller, 1775)
- Anthracia ephialtes (Hübner, 1822)
- Antitype chi (Linnaeus, 1758)
- Antitype suda (Geyer, 1832)
- Apamea alpigena (Boisduval, 1837)
- Apamea anceps (Denis & Schiffermuller, 1775)
- Apamea aquila Donzel, 1837
- Apamea crenata (Hufnagel, 1766)
- Apamea epomidion (Haworth, 1809)
- Apamea furva (Denis & Schiffermuller, 1775)
- Apamea illyria Freyer, 1846
- Apamea lateritia (Hufnagel, 1766)
- Apamea lithoxylaea (Denis & Schiffermuller, 1775)
- Apamea maillardi (Geyer, 1834)
- Apamea monoglypha (Hufnagel, 1766)
- Apamea oblonga (Haworth, 1809)
- Apamea platinea (Treitschke, 1825)
- Apamea remissa (Hübner, 1809)
- Apamea rubrirena (Treitschke, 1825)
- Apamea scolopacina (Esper, 1788)
- Apamea sordens (Hufnagel, 1766)
- Apamea sublustris (Esper, 1788)
- Apamea syriaca (Osthelder, 1933)
- Apamea unanimis (Hübner, 1813)
- Apamea zeta (Treitschke, 1825)
- Aporophyla australis (Boisduval, 1829)
- Aporophyla canescens (Duponchel, 1826)
- Aporophyla lueneburgensis (Freyer, 1848)
- Aporophyla nigra (Haworth, 1809)
- Apterogenum ypsillon (Denis & Schiffermuller, 1775)
- Archanara dissoluta (Treitschke, 1825)
- Archanara neurica (Hübner, 1808)
- Arenostola phragmitidis (Hübner, 1803)
- Asteroscopus sphinx (Hufnagel, 1766)
- Atethmia centrago (Haworth, 1809)
- Athetis gluteosa (Treitschke, 1835)
- Athetis pallustris (Hübner, 1808)
- Athetis hospes (Freyer, 1831)
- Athetis lepigone (Moschler, 1860)
- Atypha pulmonaris (Esper, 1790)
- Auchmis detersa (Esper, 1787)
- Autographa aemula (Denis & Schiffermuller, 1775)
- Autographa bractea (Denis & Schiffermuller, 1775)
- Autographa gamma (Linnaeus, 1758)
- Autographa jota (Linnaeus, 1758)
- Autographa pulchrina (Haworth, 1809)
- Axylia putris (Linnaeus, 1761)
- Brachionycha nubeculosa (Esper, 1785)
- Brachylomia viminalis (Fabricius, 1776)
- Brithys crini (Fabricius, 1775)
- Bryonycta pineti (Staudinger, 1859)
- Bryophila galathea Milliere, 1875
- Bryophila raptricula (Denis & Schiffermuller, 1775)
- Bryophila ravula (Hübner, 1813)
- Bryophila vandalusiae Duponchel, 1842
- Bryophila domestica (Hufnagel, 1766)
- Bryophila petrea Guenee, 1852
- Calamia tridens (Hufnagel, 1766)
- Calliergis ramosa (Esper, 1786)
- Callopistria juventina (Stoll, 1782)
- Callopistria latreillei (Duponchel, 1827)
- Calophasia almoravida Graslin, 1863
- Calophasia lunula (Hufnagel, 1766)
- Calophasia opalina (Esper, 1793)
- Calophasia platyptera (Esper, 1788)
- Caradrina germainii (Duponchel, 1835)
- Caradrina morpheus (Hufnagel, 1766)
- Caradrina gilva (Donzel, 1837)
- Caradrina ingrata Staudinger, 1897
- Caradrina clavipalpis Scopoli, 1763
- Caradrina flavirena Guenee, 1852
- Caradrina fuscicornis Rambur, 1832
- Caradrina noctivaga Bellier, 1863
- Caradrina selini Boisduval, 1840
- Caradrina aspersa Rambur, 1834
- Caradrina kadenii Freyer, 1836
- Caradrina montana Bremer, 1861
- Caradrina proxima Rambur, 1837
- Caradrina terrea Freyer, 1840
- Cardepia sociabilis (de Graslin, 1850)
- Celaena haworthii (Curtis, 1829)
- Ceramica pisi (Linnaeus, 1758)
- Cerapteryx graminis (Linnaeus, 1758)
- Cerastis faceta (Treitschke, 1835)
- Cerastis leucographa (Denis & Schiffermuller, 1775)
- Cerastis rubricosa (Denis & Schiffermuller, 1775)
- Charanyca trigrammica (Hufnagel, 1766)
- Charanyca ferruginea (Esper, 1785)
- Chersotis alpestris (Boisduval, 1837)
- Chersotis anatolica (Draudt, 1936)
- Chersotis andereggii (Boisduval, 1832)
- Chersotis cuprea (Denis & Schiffermuller, 1775)
- Chersotis cyrnea (Spuler, 1908)
- Chersotis elegans (Eversmann, 1837)
- Chersotis fimbriola (Esper, 1803)
- Chersotis larixia (Guenee, 1852)
- Chersotis margaritacea (Villers, 1789)
- Chersotis multangula (Hübner, 1803)
- Chersotis ocellina (Denis & Schiffermuller, 1775)
- Chersotis oreina Dufay, 1984
- Chersotis rectangula (Denis & Schiffermuller, 1775)
- Chilodes maritima (Tauscher, 1806)
- Chloantha hyperici (Denis & Schiffermuller, 1775)
- Chrysodeixis acuta (Walker, 1858)
- Chrysodeixis chalcites (Esper, 1789)
- Clemathada calberlai (Staudinger, 1883)
- Cleoceris scoriacea (Esper, 1789)
- Cleonymia baetica (Rambur, 1837)
- Cleonymia yvanii (Duponchel, 1833)
- Coenobia rufa (Haworth, 1809)
- Coenophila subrosea (Stephens, 1829)
- Colocasia coryli (Linnaeus, 1758)
- Conisania renati (Oberthur, 1890)
- Conisania luteago (Denis & Schiffermuller, 1775)
- Conistra alicia Lajonquiere, 1939
- Conistra daubei (Duponchel, 1838)
- Conistra gallica (Lederer, 1857)
- Conistra intricata (Boisduval, 1829)
- Conistra ligula (Esper, 1791)
- Conistra rubiginosa (Scopoli, 1763)
- Conistra vaccinii (Linnaeus, 1761)
- Conistra veronicae (Hübner, 1813)
- Conistra erythrocephala (Denis & Schiffermuller, 1775)
- Conistra rubiginea (Denis & Schiffermuller, 1775)
- Conistra staudingeri (Graslin, 1863)
- Conistra torrida (Lederer, 1857)
- Coranarta cordigera (Thunberg, 1788)
- Cosmia trapezina (Linnaeus, 1758)
- Cosmia diffinis (Linnaeus, 1767)
- Cosmia pyralina (Denis & Schiffermuller, 1775)
- Cosmia affinis (Linnaeus, 1767)
- Craniophora ligustri (Denis & Schiffermuller, 1775)
- Craniophora pontica (Staudinger, 1878)
- Cryphia simulatricula (Guenee, 1852)
- Cryphia algae (Fabricius, 1775)
- Cryphia ochsi (Boursin, 1940)
- Cryphia pallida (Baker, 1894)
- Crypsedra gemmea (Treitschke, 1825)
- Ctenoplusia accentifera (Lefebvre, 1827)
- Cucullia absinthii (Linnaeus, 1761)
- Cucullia argentea (Hufnagel, 1766)
- Cucullia artemisiae (Hufnagel, 1766)
- Cucullia asteris (Denis & Schiffermuller, 1775)
- Cucullia calendulae Treitschke, 1835
- Cucullia cemenelensis Boursin, 1923
- Cucullia chamomillae (Denis & Schiffermuller, 1775)
- Cucullia cineracea Freyer, 1841
- Cucullia dracunculi (Hübner, 1813)
- Cucullia formosa Rogenhofer, 1860
- Cucullia gnaphalii (Hübner, 1813)
- Cucullia lactucae (Denis & Schiffermuller, 1775)
- Cucullia lucifuga (Denis & Schiffermuller, 1775)
- Cucullia santolinae Rambur, 1834
- Cucullia santonici (Hübner, 1813)
- Cucullia tanaceti (Denis & Schiffermuller, 1775)
- Cucullia umbratica (Linnaeus, 1758)
- Cucullia xeranthemi Boisduval, 1840
- Cucullia caninae Rambur, 1833
- Cucullia lanceolata (Villers, 1789)
- Cucullia lychnitis Rambur, 1833
- Cucullia prenanthis Boisduval, 1840
- Cucullia reisseri Boursin, 1933
- Cucullia scrophulariae (Denis & Schiffermuller, 1775)
- Cucullia scrophulariphaga Rambur, 1833
- Cucullia scrophulariphila Staudinger, 1859
- Cucullia verbasci (Linnaeus, 1758)
- Dasypolia ferdinandi Ruhl, 1892
- Dasypolia templi (Thunberg, 1792)
- Deltote bankiana (Fabricius, 1775)
- Deltote deceptoria (Scopoli, 1763)
- Deltote uncula (Clerck, 1759)
- Deltote pygarga (Hufnagel, 1766)
- Denticucullus pygmina (Haworth, 1809)
- Diachrysia chrysitis (Linnaeus, 1758)
- Diachrysia chryson (Esper, 1789)
- Diachrysia nadeja (Oberthur, 1880)
- Diachrysia stenochrysis (Warren, 1913)
- Diarsia brunnea (Denis & Schiffermuller, 1775)
- Diarsia dahlii (Hübner, 1813)
- Diarsia florida (F. Schmidt, 1859)
- Diarsia guadarramensis (Boursin, 1928)
- Diarsia mendica (Fabricius, 1775)
- Diarsia rubi (Vieweg, 1790)
- Dichagyris flammatra (Denis & Schiffermuller, 1775)
- Dichagyris musiva (Hübner, 1803)
- Dichagyris candelisequa (Denis & Schiffermuller, 1775)
- Dichagyris celsicola (Bellier, 1859)
- Dichagyris constanti (Milliere, 1860)
- Dichagyris forcipula (Denis & Schiffermuller, 1775)
- Dichagyris nigrescens (Hofner, 1888)
- Dichagyris renigera (Hübner, 1808)
- Dichagyris signifera (Denis & Schiffermuller, 1775)
- Dichagyris vallesiaca (Boisduval, 1837)
- Dichonia aeruginea (Hübner, 1808)
- Dichonia convergens (Denis & Schiffermuller, 1775)
- Dicycla oo (Linnaeus, 1758)
- Diloba caeruleocephala (Linnaeus, 1758)
- Dryobota labecula (Esper, 1788)
- Dryobotodes tenebrosa (Esper, 1789)
- Dryobotodes carbonis Wagner, 1931
- Dryobotodes eremita (Fabricius, 1775)
- Dryobotodes monochroma (Esper, 1790)
- Dryobotodes roboris (Geyer, 1835)
- Dypterygia scabriuscula (Linnaeus, 1758)
- Egira conspicillaris (Linnaeus, 1758)
- Elaphria venustula (Hübner, 1790)
- Enargia paleacea (Esper, 1788)
- Enterpia laudeti (Boisduval, 1840)
- Epilecta linogrisea (Denis & Schiffermuller, 1775)
- Epimecia ustula (Freyer, 1835)
- Episema glaucina (Esper, 1789)
- Episema grueneri Boisduval, 1837
- Eremobia ochroleuca (Denis & Schiffermuller, 1775)
- Eremohadena chenopodiphaga (Rambur, 1832)
- Eremohadena halimi (Milliere, 1877)
- Eucarta amethystina (Hübner, 1803)
- Euchalcia bellieri (Kirby, 1900)
- Euchalcia modestoides Poole, 1989
- Euchalcia variabilis (Piller, 1783)
- Eucoptocnemis optabilis (Boisduval, 1834)
- Eugnorisma glareosa (Esper, 1788)
- Eugnorisma depuncta (Linnaeus, 1761)
- Eugraphe sigma (Denis & Schiffermuller, 1775)
- Euplexia lucipara (Linnaeus, 1758)
- Eupsilia transversa (Hufnagel, 1766)
- Eurois occulta (Linnaeus, 1758)
- Euxoa lidia (Stoll, 1782)
- Euxoa aquilina (Denis & Schiffermuller, 1775)
- Euxoa birivia (Denis & Schiffermuller, 1775)
- Euxoa conspicua (Hübner, 1824)
- Euxoa cos (Hübner, 1824)
- Euxoa culminicola (Staudinger, 1870)
- Euxoa cursoria (Hufnagel, 1766)
- Euxoa decora (Denis & Schiffermuller, 1775)
- Euxoa distinguenda (Lederer, 1857)
- Euxoa eruta (Hübner, 1817)
- Euxoa hastifera (Donzel, 1847)
- Euxoa nigricans (Linnaeus, 1761)
- Euxoa nigrofusca (Esper, 1788)
- Euxoa obelisca (Denis & Schiffermuller, 1775)
- Euxoa recussa (Hübner, 1817)
- Euxoa temera (Hübner, 1808)
- Euxoa tritici (Linnaeus, 1761)
- Euxoa vitta (Esper, 1789)
- Euxoa haverkampfi (Standfuss, 1893)
- Evisa schawerdae Reisser, 1930
- Globia algae (Esper, 1789)
- Globia sparganii (Esper, 1790)
- Gortyna borelii Pierret, 1837
- Gortyna flavago (Denis & Schiffermuller, 1775)
- Gortyna xanthenes Germar, 1842
- Graphiphora augur (Fabricius, 1775)
- Griposia aprilina (Linnaeus, 1758)
- Hada plebeja (Linnaeus, 1761)
- Hadena irregularis (Hufnagel, 1766)
- Hadena perplexa (Denis & Schiffermuller, 1775)
- Hadena ruetimeyeri Boursin, 1951
- Hadena sancta (Staudinger, 1859)
- Hadena silenes (Hübner, 1822)
- Hadena adriana (Schawerda, 1921)
- Hadena albimacula (Borkhausen, 1792)
- Hadena bicruris (Hufnagel, 1766)
- Hadena caesia (Denis & Schiffermuller, 1775)
- Hadena clara (Staudinger, 1901)
- Hadena compta (Denis & Schiffermuller, 1775)
- Hadena confusa (Hufnagel, 1766)
- Hadena consparcatoides (Schawerda, 1928)
- Hadena filograna (Esper, 1788)
- Hadena luteocincta (Rambur, 1834)
- Hadena magnolii (Boisduval, 1829)
- Hadena tephroleuca (Boisduval, 1833)
- Haemerosia renalis (Hübner, 1813)
- Hecatera bicolorata (Hufnagel, 1766)
- Hecatera cappa (Hübner, 1809)
- Hecatera corsica (Rambur, 1832)
- Hecatera dysodea (Denis & Schiffermuller, 1775)
- Helicoverpa armigera (Hübner, 1808)
- Heliothis maritima Graslin, 1855
- Heliothis nubigera Herrich-Schaffer, 1851
- Heliothis ononis (Denis & Schiffermuller, 1775)
- Heliothis peltigera (Denis & Schiffermuller, 1775)
- Heliothis viriplaca (Hufnagel, 1766)
- Helotropha leucostigma (Hübner, 1808)
- Heterophysa dumetorum (Geyer, 1834)
- Hoplodrina ambigua (Denis & Schiffermuller, 1775)
- Hoplodrina blanda (Denis & Schiffermuller, 1775)
- Hoplodrina hesperica Dufay & Boursin, 1960
- Hoplodrina octogenaria (Goeze, 1781)
- Hoplodrina respersa (Denis & Schiffermuller, 1775)
- Hoplodrina superstes (Ochsenheimer, 1816)
- Hydraecia micacea (Esper, 1789)
- Hydraecia osseola Staudinger, 1882
- Hydraecia petasitis Doubleday, 1847
- Hyppa rectilinea (Esper, 1788)
- Ipimorpha retusa (Linnaeus, 1761)
- Ipimorpha subtusa (Denis & Schiffermuller, 1775)
- Jodia croceago (Denis & Schiffermuller, 1775)
- Lacanobia contigua (Denis & Schiffermuller, 1775)
- Lacanobia suasa (Denis & Schiffermuller, 1775)
- Lacanobia thalassina (Hufnagel, 1766)
- Lacanobia aliena (Hübner, 1809)
- Lacanobia blenna (Hübner, 1824)
- Lacanobia oleracea (Linnaeus, 1758)
- Lacanobia splendens (Hübner, 1808)
- Lacanobia w-latinum (Hufnagel, 1766)
- Lamprosticta culta (Denis & Schiffermuller, 1775)
- Lamprotes c-aureum (Knoch, 1781)
- Lasionycta imbecilla (Fabricius, 1794)
- Lasionycta proxima (Hübner, 1809)
- Lateroligia ophiogramma (Esper, 1794)
- Lenisa geminipuncta (Haworth, 1809)
- Leucania loreyi (Duponchel, 1827)
- Leucania comma (Linnaeus, 1761)
- Leucania joannisi Boursin & Rungs, 1952
- Leucania obsoleta (Hübner, 1803)
- Leucania punctosa (Treitschke, 1825)
- Leucania putrescens (Hübner, 1824)
- Leucania zeae (Duponchel, 1827)
- Leucochlaena oditis (Hübner, 1822)
- Lithophane consocia (Borkhausen, 1792)
- Lithophane furcifera (Hufnagel, 1766)
- Lithophane lamda (Fabricius, 1787)
- Lithophane merckii (Rambur, 1832)
- Lithophane ornitopus (Hufnagel, 1766)
- Lithophane semibrunnea (Haworth, 1809)
- Lithophane socia (Hufnagel, 1766)
- Lithophane leautieri (Boisduval, 1829)
- Litoligia literosa (Haworth, 1809)
- Longalatedes elymi (Treitschke, 1825)
- Lophoterges millierei (Staudinger, 1871)
- Luperina dumerilii (Duponchel, 1826)
- Luperina rubella (Duponchel, 1835)
- Luperina testacea (Denis & Schiffermuller, 1775)
- Lycophotia erythrina (Herrich-Schaffer, 1852)
- Lycophotia molothina (Esper, 1789)
- Lycophotia porphyrea (Denis & Schiffermuller, 1775)
- Macdunnoughia confusa (Stephens, 1850)
- Mamestra brassicae (Linnaeus, 1758)
- Meganephria bimaculosa (Linnaeus, 1767)
- Melanchra persicariae (Linnaeus, 1761)
- Mesapamea remmi Rezbanyai-Reser, 1985
- Mesapamea secalella Remm, 1983
- Mesapamea secalis (Linnaeus, 1758)
- Mesogona acetosellae (Denis & Schiffermuller, 1775)
- Mesogona oxalina (Hübner, 1803)
- Mesoligia furuncula (Denis & Schiffermuller, 1775)
- Metopoceras felicina (Donzel, 1844)
- Mniotype adusta (Esper, 1790)
- Mniotype anilis (Boisduval, 1840)
- Mniotype occidentalis Yela, Fibiger, Ronkay & Zilli, 2010
- Mniotype satura (Denis & Schiffermuller, 1775)
- Mniotype solieri (Boisduval, 1829)
- Mniotype spinosa (Chretien, 1910)
- Moma alpium (Osbeck, 1778)
- Mormo maura (Linnaeus, 1758)
- Mythimna riparia (Rambur, 1829)
- Mythimna albipuncta (Denis & Schiffermuller, 1775)
- Mythimna congrua (Hübner, 1817)
- Mythimna ferrago (Fabricius, 1787)
- Mythimna l-album (Linnaeus, 1767)
- Mythimna litoralis (Curtis, 1827)
- Mythimna conigera (Denis & Schiffermuller, 1775)
- Mythimna impura (Hübner, 1808)
- Mythimna pallens (Linnaeus, 1758)
- Mythimna pudorina (Denis & Schiffermuller, 1775)
- Mythimna straminea (Treitschke, 1825)
- Mythimna turca (Linnaeus, 1761)
- Mythimna vitellina (Hübner, 1808)
- Mythimna prominens (Walker, 1856)
- Mythimna unipuncta (Haworth, 1809)
- Mythimna alopecuri (Boisduval, 1840)
- Mythimna andereggii (Boisduval, 1840)
- Mythimna sicula (Treitschke, 1835)
- Naenia typica (Linnaeus, 1758)
- Noctua comes Hübner, 1813
- Noctua fimbriata (Schreber, 1759)
- Noctua interjecta Hübner, 1803
- Noctua interposita (Hübner, 1790)
- Noctua janthe (Borkhausen, 1792)
- Noctua janthina Denis & Schiffermuller, 1775
- Noctua orbona (Hufnagel, 1766)
- Noctua pronuba (Linnaeus, 1758)
- Noctua tirrenica Biebinger, Speidel & Hanigk, 1983
- Nonagria typhae (Thunberg, 1784)
- Nyctobrya muralis (Forster, 1771)
- Ochropleura leucogaster (Freyer, 1831)
- Ochropleura plecta (Linnaeus, 1761)
- Oligia fasciuncula (Haworth, 1809)
- Oligia latruncula (Denis & Schiffermuller, 1775)
- Oligia strigilis (Linnaeus, 1758)
- Oligia versicolor (Borkhausen, 1792)
- Olivenebula xanthochloris (Boisduval, 1840)
- Omia cyclopea (Graslin, 1837)
- Omia cymbalariae (Hübner, 1809)
- Omphalophana antirrhinii (Hübner, 1803)
- Opigena polygona (Denis & Schiffermuller, 1775)
- Oria musculosa (Hübner, 1808)
- Orthosia gracilis (Denis & Schiffermuller, 1775)
- Orthosia opima (Hübner, 1809)
- Orthosia cerasi (Fabricius, 1775)
- Orthosia cruda (Denis & Schiffermuller, 1775)
- Orthosia miniosa (Denis & Schiffermuller, 1775)
- Orthosia populeti (Fabricius, 1775)
- Orthosia incerta (Hufnagel, 1766)
- Orthosia gothica (Linnaeus, 1758)
- Oxicesta chamoenices (Herrich-Schaffer, 1845)
- Oxicesta geographica (Fabricius, 1787)
- Oxicesta serratae (Zerny, 1927)
- Pabulatrix pabulatricula (Brahm, 1791)
- Pachetra sagittigera (Hufnagel, 1766)
- Panchrysia aurea (Hübner, 1803)
- Panchrysia v-argenteum (Esper, 1798)
- Panemeria tenebrata (Scopoli, 1763)
- Panolis flammea (Denis & Schiffermuller, 1775)
- Papestra biren (Goeze, 1781)
- Paradiarsia punicea (Hübner, 1803)
- Parastichtis suspecta (Hübner, 1817)
- Pardoxia graellsi (Feisthamel, 1837)
- Peridroma saucia (Hübner, 1808)
- Perigrapha i-cinctum (Denis & Schiffermuller, 1775)
- Perigrapha rorida Frivaldszky, 1835
- Periphanes delphinii (Linnaeus, 1758)
- Phlogophora meticulosa (Linnaeus, 1758)
- Phlogophora scita (Hübner, 1790)
- Photedes captiuncula (Treitschke, 1825)
- Photedes dulcis (Oberthur, 1918)
- Photedes extrema (Hübner, 1809)
- Photedes fluxa (Hübner, 1809)
- Photedes minima (Haworth, 1809)
- Photedes morrisii (Dale, 1837)
- Phragmatiphila nexa (Hübner, 1808)
- Phyllophila obliterata (Rambur, 1833)
- Plusia festucae (Linnaeus, 1758)
- Plusia putnami (Grote, 1873)
- Polia bombycina (Hufnagel, 1766)
- Polia hepatica (Clerck, 1759)
- Polia nebulosa (Hufnagel, 1766)
- Polia serratilinea Ochsenheimer, 1816
- Polychrysia moneta (Fabricius, 1787)
- Polymixis lichenea (Hübner, 1813)
- Polymixis argillaceago (Hübner, 1822)
- Polymixis dubia (Duponchel, 1836)
- Polymixis flavicincta (Denis & Schiffermuller, 1775)
- Polymixis polymita (Linnaeus, 1761)
- Polymixis rufocincta (Geyer, 1828)
- Polymixis xanthomista (Hübner, 1819)
- Polyphaenis sericata (Esper, 1787)
- Protarchanara brevilinea (Fenn, 1864)
- Protolampra sobrina (Duponchel, 1843)
- Protoschinia scutosa (Denis & Schiffermuller, 1775)
- Pseudenargia ulicis (Staudinger, 1859)
- Pseudluperina pozzii (Curo, 1883)
- Pseudozarba bipartita (Herrich-Schaffer, 1850)
- Pyrrhia umbra (Hufnagel, 1766)
- Raphia hybris (Hübner, 1813)
- Recoropha canteneri (Duponchel, 1833)
- Rhizedra lutosa (Hübner, 1803)
- Rhyacia helvetina (Boisduval, 1833)
- Rhyacia lucipeta (Denis & Schiffermuller, 1775)
- Rhyacia simulans (Hufnagel, 1766)
- Schinia cardui (Hübner, 1790)
- Scotochrosta pulla (Denis & Schiffermuller, 1775)
- Sedina buettneri (E. Hering, 1858)
- Senta flammea (Curtis, 1828)
- Sesamia cretica Lederer, 1857
- Sesamia nonagrioides Lefebvre, 1827
- Sideridis rivularis (Fabricius, 1775)
- Sideridis kitti (Schawerda, 1914)
- Sideridis reticulata (Goeze, 1781)
- Sideridis lampra (Schawerda, 1913)
- Sideridis turbida (Esper, 1790)
- Simyra albovenosa (Goeze, 1781)
- Simyra nervosa (Denis & Schiffermuller, 1775)
- Spaelotis ravida (Denis & Schiffermuller, 1775)
- Spaelotis senna (Freyer, 1829)
- Spodoptera cilium Guenee, 1852
- Spodoptera exigua (Hübner, 1808)
- Spodoptera littoralis (Boisduval, 1833)
- Standfussiana dalmata (Staudinger, 1901)
- Standfussiana insulicola (Turati, 1919)
- Standfussiana lucernea (Linnaeus, 1758)
- Standfussiana nictymera (Boisduval, 1834)
- Standfussiana wiskotti (Standfuss, 1888)
- Stilbia anomala (Haworth, 1812)
- Stilbia calberlae (Failla-Tedaldi, 1890)
- Stilbia faillae Pungeler, 1918
- Stilbia philopalis Graslin, 1852
- Subacronicta megacephala (Denis & Schiffermuller, 1775)
- Sympistis funebris (Hübner, 1809)
- Sympistis nigrita (Boisduval, 1840)
- Syngrapha ain (Hochenwarth, 1785)
- Syngrapha devergens (Hübner, 1813)
- Syngrapha hochenwarthi (Hochenwarth, 1785)
- Syngrapha interrogationis (Linnaeus, 1758)
- Synthymia fixa (Fabricius, 1787)
- Teinoptera olivina (Herrich-Schaffer, 1852)
- Thalpophila matura (Hufnagel, 1766)
- Thalpophila vitalba (Freyer, 1834)
- Tholera cespitis (Denis & Schiffermuller, 1775)
- Tholera decimalis (Poda, 1761)
- Thysanoplusia circumscripta (Freyer, 1831)
- Thysanoplusia daubei (Boisduval, 1840)
- Thysanoplusia orichalcea (Fabricius, 1775)
- Tiliacea aurago (Denis & Schiffermuller, 1775)
- Tiliacea citrago (Linnaeus, 1758)
- Tiliacea sulphurago (Denis & Schiffermuller, 1775)
- Trachea atriplicis (Linnaeus, 1758)
- Trichoplusia ni (Hübner, 1803)
- Trichosea ludifica (Linnaeus, 1758)
- Trigonophora haasi (Staudinger, 1892)
- Trigonophora crassicornis (Oberthur, 1918)
- Trigonophora flammea (Esper, 1785)
- Trigonophora jodea (Herrich-Schaffer, 1850)
- Tyta luctuosa (Denis & Schiffermuller, 1775)
- Ulochlaena hirta (Hübner, 1813)
- Unchelea myodea (Rambur, 1858)
- Valeria jaspidea (Villers, 1789)
- Valeria oleagina (Denis & Schiffermuller, 1775)
- Xanthia gilvago (Denis & Schiffermuller, 1775)
- Xanthia icteritia (Hufnagel, 1766)
- Xanthia ocellaris (Borkhausen, 1792)
- Xanthia ruticilla (Esper, 1791)
- Xanthia togata (Esper, 1788)
- Xanthodes albago (Fabricius, 1794)
- Xestia ashworthii (Doubleday, 1855)
- Xestia c-nigrum (Linnaeus, 1758)
- Xestia ditrapezium (Denis & Schiffermuller, 1775)
- Xestia triangulum (Hufnagel, 1766)
- Xestia alpicola (Zetterstedt, 1839)
- Xestia rhaetica (Staudinger, 1871)
- Xestia sincera (Herrich-Schaffer, 1851)
- Xestia speciosa (Hübner, 1813)
- Xestia viridescens (Turati, 1919)
- Xestia agathina (Duponchel, 1827)
- Xestia baja (Denis & Schiffermuller, 1775)
- Xestia castanea (Esper, 1798)
- Xestia cohaesa (Herrich-Schaffer, 1849)
- Xestia collina (Boisduval, 1840)
- Xestia jordani (Turati, 1912)
- Xestia kermesina (Mabille, 1869)
- Xestia ochreago (Hübner, 1809)
- Xestia sexstrigata (Haworth, 1809)
- Xestia stigmatica (Hübner, 1813)
- Xestia xanthographa (Denis & Schiffermuller, 1775)
- Xylena solidaginis (Hübner, 1803)
- Xylena exsoleta (Linnaeus, 1758)
- Xylena vetusta (Hübner, 1813)
- Xylocampa areola (Esper, 1789)

== Family Nolidae ==
- Bena bicolorana (Fuessly, 1775)
- Earias clorana (Linnaeus, 1761)
- Earias insulana (Boisduval, 1833)
- Earias vernana (Fabricius, 1787)
- Garella nilotica (Rogenhofer, 1882)
- Meganola albula (Denis & Schiffermuller, 1775)
- Meganola strigula (Denis & Schiffermuller, 1775)
- Meganola togatulalis (Hübner, 1796)
- Nola aerugula (Hübner, 1793)
- Nola chlamitulalis (Hübner, 1813)
- Nola cicatricalis (Treitschke, 1835)
- Nola confusalis (Herrich-Schaffer, 1847)
- Nola cristatula (Hübner, 1793)
- Nola cucullatella (Linnaeus, 1758)
- Nola dresnayi (Warnecke, 1946)
- Nola kruegeri (Turati, 1911)
- Nola squalida Staudinger, 1871
- Nola subchlamydula Staudinger, 1871
- Nola thymula Milliere, 1867
- Nycteola asiatica (Krulikovsky, 1904)
- Nycteola columbana (Turner, 1925)
- Nycteola degenerana (Hübner, 1799)
- Nycteola revayana (Scopoli, 1772)
- Nycteola siculana (Fuchs, 1899)
- Pseudoips prasinana (Linnaeus, 1758)

== Family Notodontidae ==
- Cerura erminea (Esper, 1783)
- Cerura vinula (Linnaeus, 1758)
- Clostera anachoreta (Denis & Schiffermuller, 1775)
- Clostera anastomosis (Linnaeus, 1758)
- Clostera curtula (Linnaeus, 1758)
- Clostera pigra (Hufnagel, 1766)
- Dicranura ulmi (Denis & Schiffermuller, 1775)
- Drymonia dodonaea (Denis & Schiffermuller, 1775)
- Drymonia obliterata (Esper, 1785)
- Drymonia querna (Denis & Schiffermuller, 1775)
- Drymonia ruficornis (Hufnagel, 1766)
- Drymonia velitaris (Hufnagel, 1766)
- Furcula bicuspis (Borkhausen, 1790)
- Furcula bifida (Brahm, 1787)
- Furcula furcula (Clerck, 1759)
- Gluphisia crenata (Esper, 1785)
- Harpyia milhauseri (Fabricius, 1775)
- Leucodonta bicoloria (Denis & Schiffermuller, 1775)
- Neoharpyia verbasci (Fabricius, 1798)
- Notodonta dromedarius (Linnaeus, 1767)
- Notodonta torva (Hübner, 1803)
- Notodonta tritophus (Denis & Schiffermuller, 1775)
- Notodonta ziczac (Linnaeus, 1758)
- Odontosia carmelita (Esper, 1799)
- Peridea anceps (Goeze, 1781)
- Phalera bucephala (Linnaeus, 1758)
- Phalera bucephaloides (Ochsenheimer, 1810)
- Pheosia gnoma (Fabricius, 1776)
- Pheosia tremula (Clerck, 1759)
- Pterostoma palpina (Clerck, 1759)
- Ptilodon cucullina (Denis & Schiffermuller, 1775)
- Ptilophora plumigera (Denis & Schiffermuller, 1775)
- Rhegmatophila alpina (Bellier, 1881)
- Spatalia argentina (Denis & Schiffermuller, 1775)
- Stauropus fagi (Linnaeus, 1758)
- Thaumetopoea pinivora (Treitschke, 1834)
- Thaumetopoea pityocampa (Denis & Schiffermuller, 1775)
- Thaumetopoea processionea (Linnaeus, 1758)

== Family Oecophoridae ==
- Alabonia geoffrella (Linnaeus, 1767)
- Alabonia staintoniella (Zeller, 1850)
- Aplota nigricans (Zeller, 1852)
- Aplota palpella (Haworth, 1828)
- Batia inexpectella Jackh, 1972
- Batia internella Jackh, 1972
- Batia lambdella (Donovan, 1793)
- Batia lunaris (Haworth, 1828)
- Bisigna procerella (Denis & Schiffermuller, 1775)
- Borkhausenia fuscescens (Haworth, 1828)
- Borkhausenia minutella (Linnaeus, 1758)
- Borkhausenia nefrax Hodges, 1974
- Buvatina tineiformis Leraut, 1984
- Crassa tinctella (Hübner, 1796)
- Crassa unitella (Hübner, 1796)
- Dasycera oliviella (Fabricius, 1794)
- Decantha borkhausenii (Zeller, 1839)
- Denisia albimaculea (Haworth, 1828)
- Denisia augustella (Hübner, 1796)
- Denisia fuscicapitella Huemer, 2001
- Denisia graslinella (Staudinger, 1871)
- Denisia luctuosella (Duponchel, 1840)
- Denisia muellerrutzi (Amsel, 1939)
- Denisia nubilosella (Herrich-Schaffer, 1854)
- Denisia pyrenaica Leraut, 1989
- Denisia ragonotella (Constant, 1885)
- Denisia rhaetica (Frey, 1856)
- Denisia similella (Hübner, 1796)
- Denisia stipella (Linnaeus, 1758)
- Denisia stroemella (Fabricius, 1779)
- Denisia subaquilea (Stainton, 1849)
- Endrosis sarcitrella (Linnaeus, 1758)
- Epicallima bruandella (Ragonot, 1889)
- Epicallima formosella (Denis & Schiffermuller, 1775)
- Esperia sulphurella (Fabricius, 1775)
- Goidanichiana jourdheuillella (Ragonot, 1875)
- Harpella forficella (Scopoli, 1763)
- Herrichia excelsella Staudinger, 1871
- Hofmannophila pseudospretella (Stainton, 1849)
- Holoscolia huebneri Kocak, 1980
- Kasyniana diminutella (Rebel, 1931)
- Metalampra cinnamomea (Zeller, 1839)
- Minetia adamczewskii (Toll, 1956)
- Minetia criella (Treitschke, 1835)
- Minetia crinitus (Fabricius, 1798)
- Oecophora bractella (Linnaeus, 1758)
- Pleurota aristella (Linnaeus, 1767)
- Pleurota bicostella (Clerck, 1759)
- Pleurota ericella (Duponchel, 1839)
- Pleurota gallicella Huemer & Luquet, 1995
- Pleurota honorella (Hübner, 1813)
- Pleurota metricella (Zeller, 1847)
- Pleurota planella (Staudinger, 1859)
- Pleurota protasella Staudinger, 1883
- Pleurota proteella Staudinger, 1880
- Pleurota pungitiella Herrich-Schaffer, 1854
- Pleurota pyropella (Denis & Schiffermuller, 1775)
- Pleurota punctella (O. Costa, 1836)
- Schiffermuelleria schaefferella (Linnaeus, 1758)
- Schiffermuelleria grandis (Desvignes, 1842)

== Family Opostegidae ==
- Opostega salaciella (Treitschke, 1833)
- Opostega spatulella Herrich-Schaffer, 1855
- Opostegoides menthinella (Mann, 1855)
- Pseudopostega auritella (Hübner, 1813)
- Pseudopostega chalcopepla (Walsingham, 1908)
- Pseudopostega crepusculella (Zeller, 1839)
