= Paralypusa =

Scientific classification
- Kingdom: Animalia
- Phylum: Arthropoda
- Clade: Pancrustacea
- Class: Insecta
- Order: Lepidoptera
- Family: Lypusidae
- Subfamily: Lypusinae
- Genus: Paralypusa; Lvovsky, 2012
- Species: P. chinensis

Binomial name
- Paralypusa chinensis (Lvovsky, 2010)

Synonyms
- Pseudatemelia chinensis Lvovsky, 2010

Genus of moths

Paralypusa chinensis is a small moth in the family Lypusidae. It is the only species in the genus Paralypusa. It was found in eastern China in Zhejiang province.

== Taxonomy ==
It was described by Alexandr L. Lvovsky in 2010 in the genus Pseudatemelia of the family Amphisbatidae as P. chinensis. He reclassified it in a new monotypic genus Paralypusa two years later.

=== Etymology ===
The generic name indicates the affinity to the genus Lypusa.

== Description ==
The wingspan is about 10 mm.
