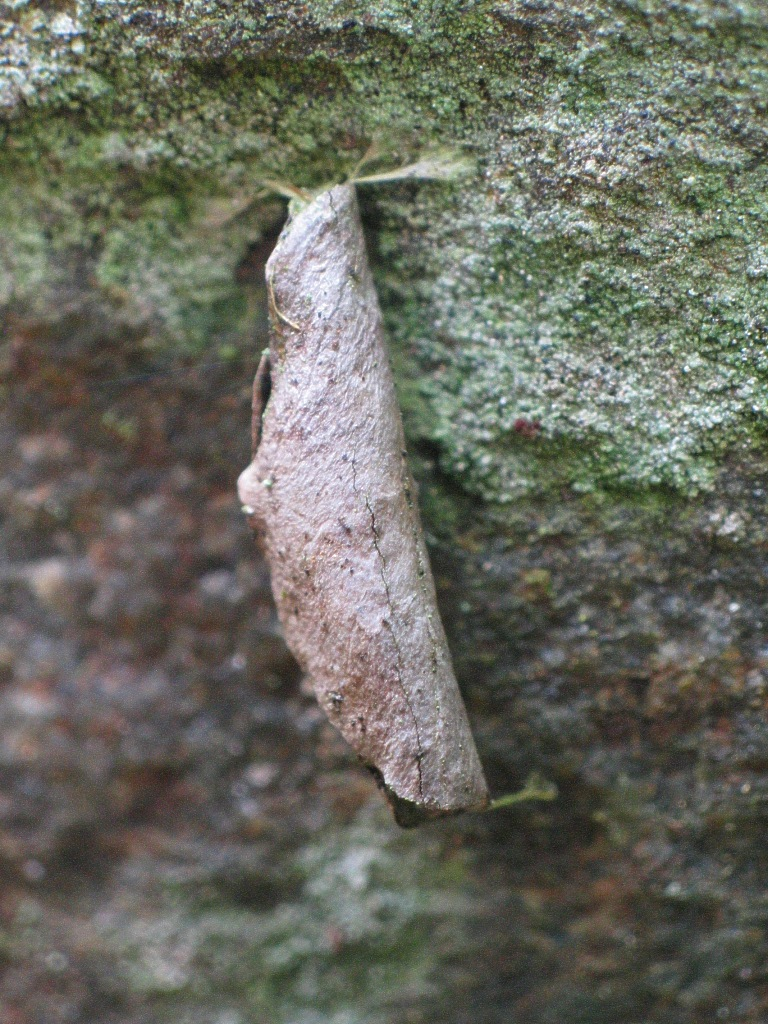
- Lypusa-tokari, 2014

Scientific classification
- Domain: Eukaryota
- Kingdom: Animalia
- Phylum: Arthropoda
- Class: Insecta
- Order: Lepidoptera
- Family: Lypusidae
- Genus: Lypusa
- Species: L. tokari

Binomial name
- Lypusa tokari Elsner, Liska & Petru, 2008

= Lypusa tokari =

Species of moth

Lypusa tokari is a moth of the Lypusidae family. It is found in Austria, Hungary, northern Italy, Bulgaria, Albania and in Slovakia. The habitat consists of warm, grassy, dry, sandy habitats mainly in oak tree forests or heath.

It is virtually identical in appearance to Lypusa maurella, but more robust and slightly larger. The length of the forewings is 7.5-8.1 mm for males and 8.2–9 mm for females.

Adults are on wing from mid-April to early June.

The larvae possibly feed on stone lichens.
