= Agnoea xanthosoma =

Scientific classification
- Domain: Eukaryota
- Kingdom: Animalia
- Phylum: Arthropoda
- Class: Insecta
- Order: Lepidoptera
- Family: Lypusidae
- Subfamily: Lypusinae
- Genus: Agnoea
- Species: A. xanthosoma

Binomial name
- Agnoea xanthosoma (Rebel, 1900)

Synonyms
- Pseudatemelia xanthosoma (Rebel, 1900); Borkhausenia xanthosoma Rebel, 1900

Species of moth

Agnoea xanthosoma is a species of moth in the family Lypusidae, found in Spain and Portugal.

Its wingspan is 20–21 mm.

This species was formerly in the genus Pseudatemelia.
