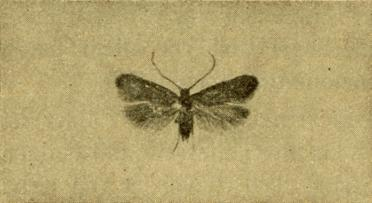

Scientific classification
- Kingdom: Animalia
- Phylum: Arthropoda
- Class: Insecta
- Order: Lepidoptera
- Family: Lypusidae
- Subfamily: Lypusinae
- Genus: Agnoea
- Species: A. aeneella

Binomial name
- Agnoea aeneella (Rebel, 1910)

Synonyms
- Pseudatemelia aeneella Rebel, 1910; Pseudatemelia chalcocrates (Meyrick, 1930); Borkhausenia aeneella (Rebel, 1910); Borkhausenia chalcocrates Meyrick, 1930

= Agnoea aeneella =

Species of moth

Agnoea aeneella is a species of moth family Lypusidae. It was described by Rebel in 1910. It is found in Croatia and Bosnia and Herzegovina.

Its wingspan is 10-11.5 mm.
