= Agnoea amparoella =

Scientific classification
- Domain: Eukaryota
- Kingdom: Animalia
- Phylum: Arthropoda
- Class: Insecta
- Order: Lepidoptera
- Family: Lypusidae
- Subfamily: Lypusinae
- Genus: Agnoea
- Species: A. amparoella

Binomial name
- Agnoea amparoella (Vives, 1986)

Synonyms
- Pseudatemelia amparoella Vives, 1986

Species of moth

Agnoea amparoella is a species of moth in the family Lypusidae.
