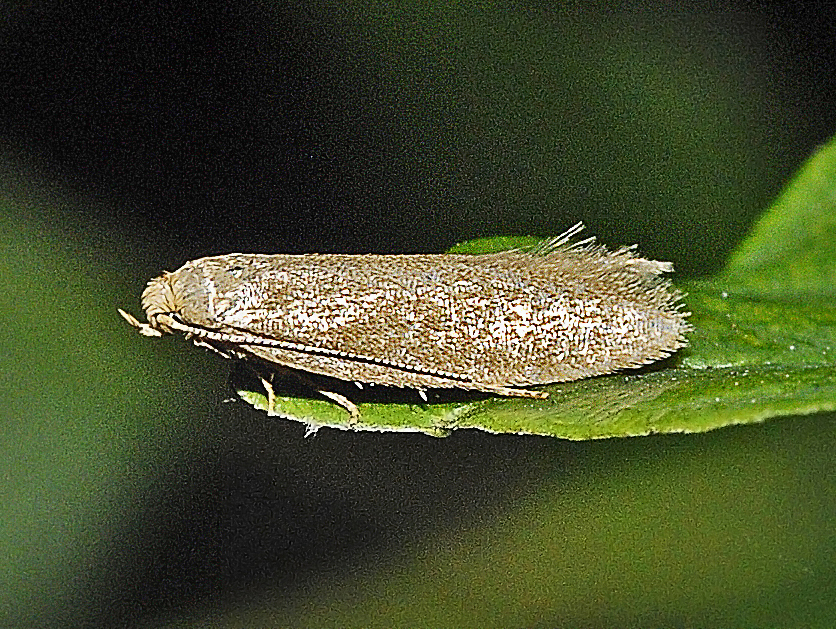

Scientific classification
- Kingdom: Animalia
- Phylum: Arthropoda
- Clade: Pancrustacea
- Class: Insecta
- Order: Lepidoptera
- Family: Lypusidae
- Subfamily: Lypusinae
- Genus: Agnoea
- Species: A. subochreella

Binomial name
- Agnoea subochreella (Doubleday, 1859)

Synonyms
- Pseudatemelia subochreella (Doubleday, 1859); Borkhausenia subochreella (Doubleday, 1859); Tubuliferola subochreella (Doubleday, 1859); Oecophora subochreella Doubleday, 1859

= Agnoea subochreella =

Species of moth

Agnoea subochreella, the Straw-coloured Tubic, is a species of gelechioid moth in the family Lypusidae.

This species was formerly in the genus Pseudatemelia.

== Taxonomy ==
Here, this species is placed within the subfamily Lypusinae of the moth family Lypusidae.

Recent research has shown that the genus Pseudatemelia is one of those close to Lypusa, the type of the family Lypusidae. The genus Pseudatemelia has been dissolved, and the species previously assigned to it transferred to the genus Agnoea. Consequently, Pseudatemelia subochreella has been assigned to the genus Agnoea, Lypusidae family, Gelechioidea superfamily.

== Distribution and habitat ==
This species is present in Europe, where it inhabits woodlands. At the periphery of its European range, it is not common; in the UK for example it is only found locally in southern England. It can also be found in the Near East and in North Africa.

== Description ==
Agnoea subochreella has a wingspan of about 17–20 mm. This moth is not conspicuously colored, even by the standards of its rather drab genus, being a ruddy ochraceous brown overall (hence the name subochreella), or more yellow-grey with darker hindwings. All wings are unmarked.

== Biology ==
The adults fly from May to July depending on the location; they are mainly nocturnal but are sometimes encountered flying around during the day. Its caterpillars live inside a self-made case built from a folded piece of leaf, that is often attached to tree trunks or stones. They eat dead and decaying leaves and similar plant remains, and probably also rotting wood.
