= Agnoea detrimentella =

Scientific classification
- Domain: Eukaryota
- Kingdom: Animalia
- Phylum: Arthropoda
- Class: Insecta
- Order: Lepidoptera
- Family: Lypusidae
- Subfamily: Lypusinae
- Genus: Agnoea
- Species: A. detrimentella

Binomial name
- Agnoea detrimentella (Staudinger, 1859)

Synonyms
- Pseudatemelia detrimentella (Staudinger, 1859); Borkhausenia detrimentella (Staudinger, 1859); Oecophora detrimentella Staudinger, 1859

Species of moth

Agnoea detrimentella is a species of moth in the family Lypusidae. It is found in Spain and Portugal.

Its wingspan is about 17 mm.

This species was formerly in the genus Pseudatemelia.
