= Agnoea pallidella =

Scientific classification
- Kingdom: Animalia
- Phylum: Arthropoda
- Clade: Pancrustacea
- Class: Insecta
- Order: Lepidoptera
- Family: Lypusidae
- Subfamily: Lypusinae
- Genus: Agnoea
- Species: A. pallidella

Binomial name
- Agnoea pallidella (Jäckh, 1972)

Synonyms
- Pseudatemelia pallidella Jäckh, 1972; Borkhausenia pallidella (Jäckh, 1972)

Species of moth

Agnoea pallidella is a species of moth in the family Lypusidae, found in Italy.

This species was formerly in the genus Pseudatemelia.
