= Agnoea elsae =

Scientific classification
- Domain: Eukaryota
- Kingdom: Animalia
- Phylum: Arthropoda
- Class: Insecta
- Order: Lepidoptera
- Family: Lypusidae
- Subfamily: Lypusinae
- Genus: Agnoea
- Species: A. elsae

Binomial name
- Agnoea elsae (Svensson, 1982)

Synonyms
- Pseudatemelia elsae Svensson, 1982; Borkhausenia elsae (Svensson, 1982)

Species of moth

Agnoea elsae is a species of moth in the family Lypusidae. It was described by Svensson, 1982. It has been recorded in Fennoscandia, Russia, the Baltic region, the Czech Republic, Slovakia, Austria, Hungary and Italy.

Its wingspan is 18–22 mm.

This species was formerly in the genus Pseudatemelia.<gbif/>
