= Agnoea langohri =

Scientific classification
- Domain: Eukaryota
- Kingdom: Animalia
- Phylum: Arthropoda
- Class: Insecta
- Order: Lepidoptera
- Family: Lypusidae
- Subfamily: Lypusinae
- Genus: Agnoea
- Species: A. langohri

Binomial name
- Agnoea langohri (Palm, 1990)

Synonyms
- Pseudatemelia langohri Palm, 1990

Species of moth

Agnoea langohri is a species of moth in the family Lypusidae, found in central Europe.

This species was formerly in the genus Pseudatemelia.
