= Agnoea latipennella =

Scientific classification
- Domain: Eukaryota
- Kingdom: Animalia
- Phylum: Arthropoda
- Class: Insecta
- Order: Lepidoptera
- Family: Lypusidae
- Subfamily: Lypusinae
- Genus: Agnoea
- Species: A. latipennella

Binomial name
- Agnoea latipennella (Jäckh, 1959)

Synonyms
- Pseudatemelia latipennella (Jäckh, 1959); Tubuliferola latipennella Jäckh, 1959

Species of moth

Agnoea latipennella is a species of moth in the family Lypusidae. It was described by Jäckh, in 1959. It has been recorded in France, the Benelux, Germany, Denmark, Austria, Slovakia and the Czech Republic.

Its wingspan is 18-22.5 mm.

This species was formerly in the genus Pseudatemelia.
