= Agnoea colurnella =

Scientific classification
- Domain: Eukaryota
- Kingdom: Animalia
- Phylum: Arthropoda
- Class: Insecta
- Order: Lepidoptera
- Family: Lypusidae
- Subfamily: Lypusinae
- Genus: Agnoea
- Species: A. colurnella

Binomial name
- Agnoea colurnella (J. J. Mann, 1867)

Synonyms
- Pseudatemelia colurnella (Mann, 1867); Borkhausenia colurnella (Mann, 1867); Borkhausenia pulverosella (Heinemann, 1870); Oecophora colurnella Mann, 1867; Oecophora pulverosella Heinemann, 1870

Species of moth

Agnoea colurnella is a species of moth in the family Lypusidae. It is found in France, Switzerland, Austria and Italy.

This species was formerly in the genus Pseudatemelia.
