= Agnoea synchrozella =

Scientific classification
- Domain: Eukaryota
- Kingdom: Animalia
- Phylum: Arthropoda
- Class: Insecta
- Order: Lepidoptera
- Family: Lypusidae
- Subfamily: Lypusinae
- Genus: Agnoea
- Species: A. synchrozella

Binomial name
- Agnoea synchrozella (Jäckh, 1959)

Synonyms
- Pseudatemelia synchrozella (Jäckh, 1959); Tubuliferola synchrozella Jäckh, 1959

Species of moth

Agnoea synchrozella is a species of moth in the family Lypusidae, found in France, Germany, Switzerland, Liechtenstein, Austria, Slovakia, Slovenia and Italy. This species was formerly in the genus Pseudatemelia.
