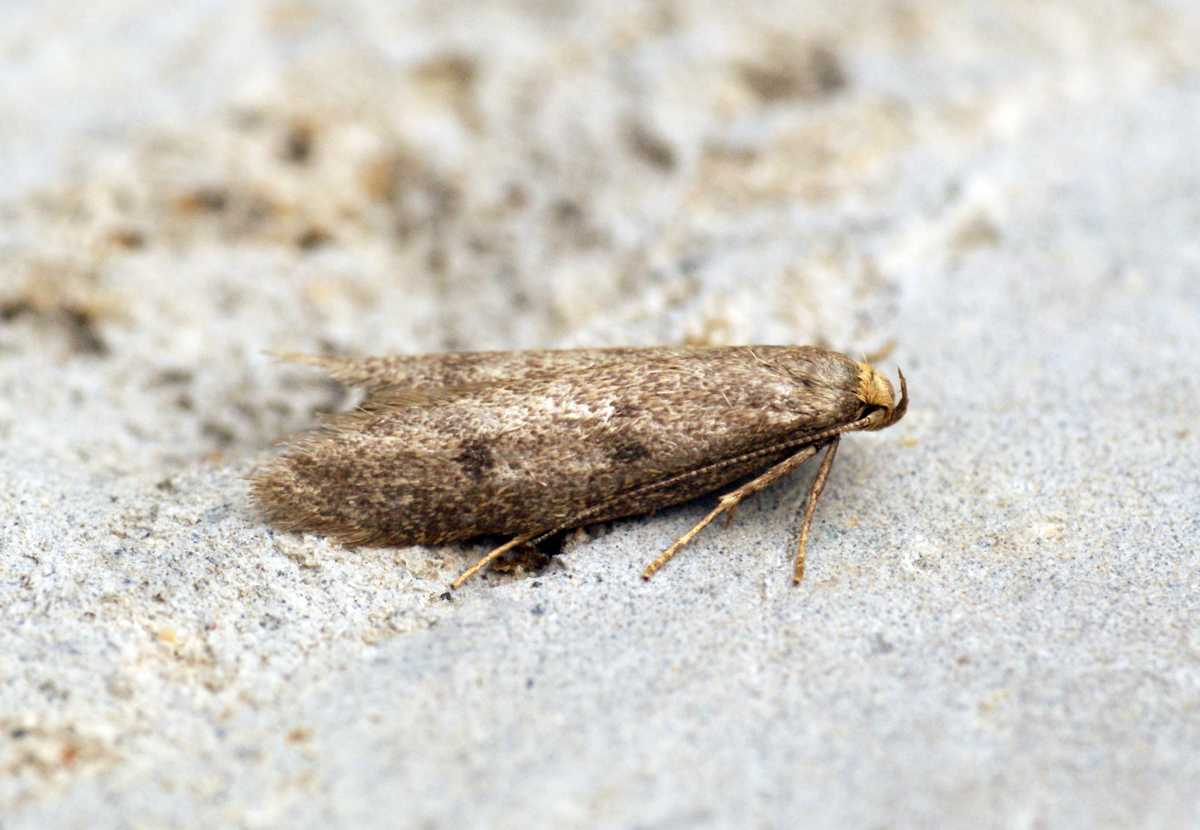

Scientific classification
- Kingdom: Animalia
- Phylum: Arthropoda
- Clade: Pancrustacea
- Class: Insecta
- Order: Lepidoptera
- Family: Lypusidae
- Genus: Agnoea
- Species: A. flavifrontella

Binomial name
- Agnoea flavifrontella (Denis & Schiffermüller, 1775)

Synonyms
- Pseudatemelia flavifrontella (Denis & Schiffermüller, 1775); Borkhausenia flavifrontella (Denis & Schiffermüller, 1775); Tubuliferola flavifrontella (Denis & Schiffermüller, 1775); Tinea flavifrontella Denis & Schiffermüller, 1775

= Agnoea flavifrontella =

Species of moth

Agnoea flavifrontella is a species of gelechioid moths in the family Lypusidae.

== Taxonomy ==
In the systematic layout used here, it is placed within the subfamily Amphisbatinae of the concealer moth family (Oecophoridae). The Amphisbatinae have alternatively been merged into the Oecophorinae, raised to full family rank, or placed as a subgroup of the Depressariinae (or Depressariidae if ranked as family). A. flavifrontella was first scientifically described by M. Denis & I. Schiffermüller in 1775. For quite some time however, its description was erroneously attributed to J. Hübner in 1801.

This species was formerly a member of the genus Pseudatemelia, but recent research has resulted in the transfer of all Pseudatemelia species to the genus Agnoea.

== Distribution and habitat ==
This species can be found in Europe, where it inhabits woodlands, and in the Near East. At the periphery of its range, it is not common; in the UK for example it is only patchily distributed, ranging northwestwards only to the English Midlands and Wales.

== Description ==
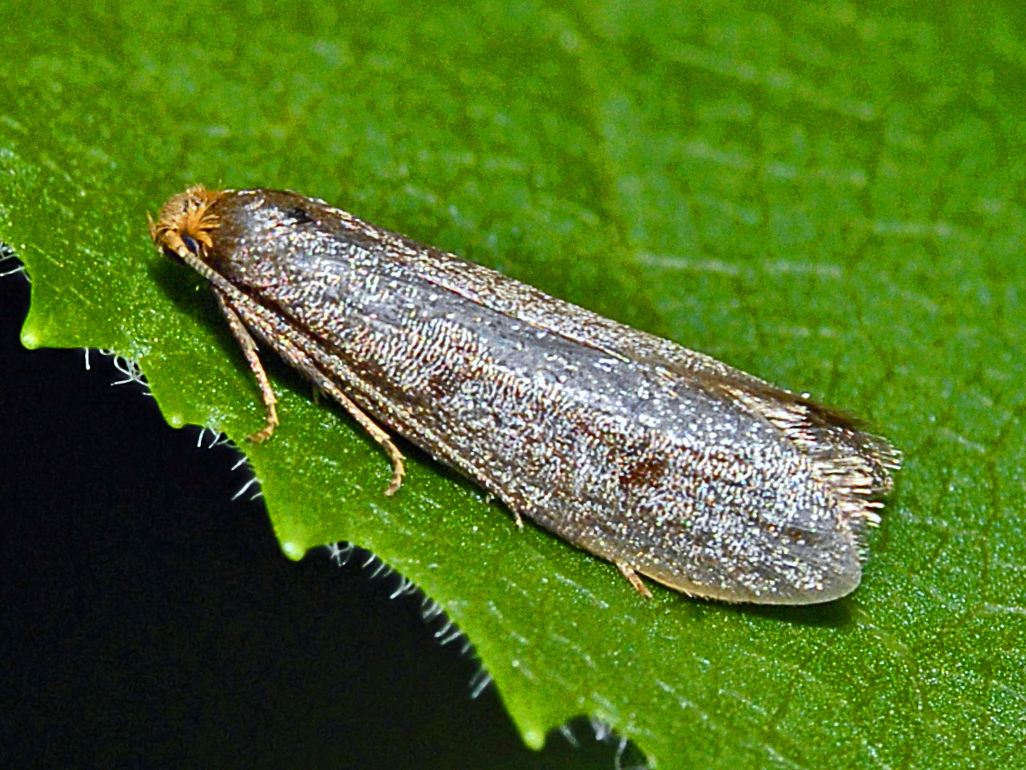
Agnoea cf. flavifrontella

The wingspan of this moth is about 20 mm; its forewing coloration is a quite drab light taupe, mottled with slightly darker tiny specks. The head is covered in orange-yellow hairs. Antennae reach about ¾ length of the long forewings, that are held in shallow roof-shaped position. Dorsal surface of the abdomen has very narrow scales.

== Biology ==
The adults fly from May to July depending on the location; they appear to be predominantly or exclusively nocturnal and can be attracted by light. Caterpillars stay in a portable case. Little is known about the food of its caterpillars. Like their relatives, they appear to be adaptable and have been recorded on such diverse foodstuffs as dead plants, dry leaves, dried insect specimens and even feathers.
