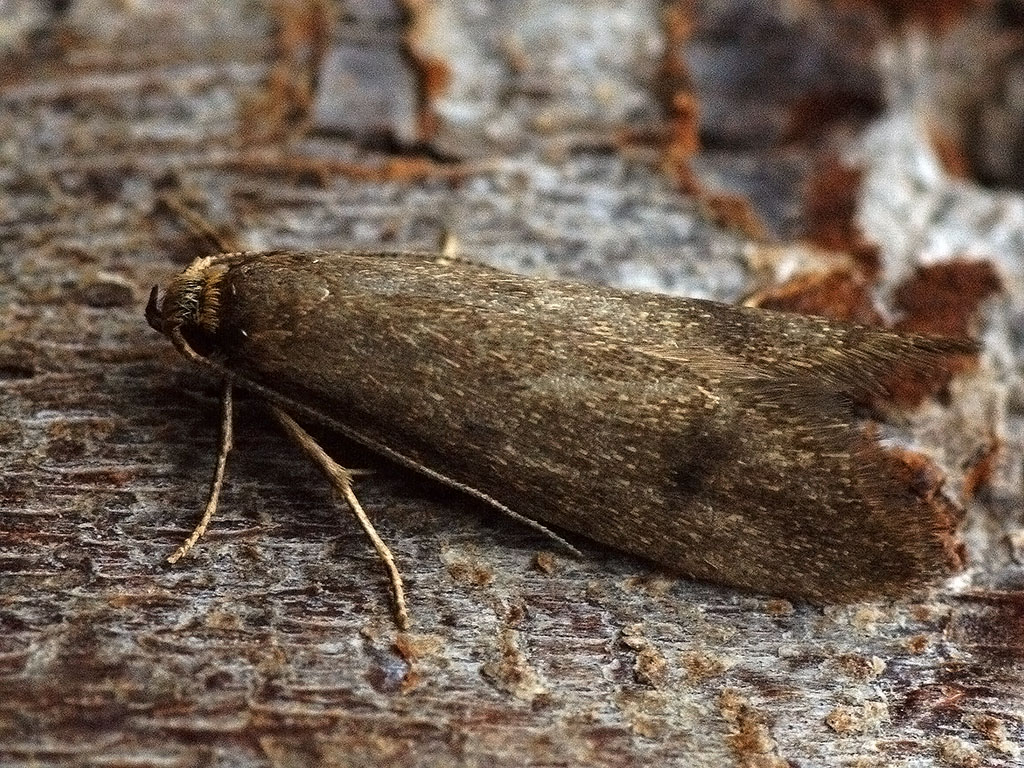

Scientific classification
- Domain: Eukaryota
- Kingdom: Animalia
- Phylum: Arthropoda
- Class: Insecta
- Order: Lepidoptera
- Family: Lypusidae
- Subfamily: Lypusinae
- Genus: Agnoea
- Species: A. josephinae

Binomial name
- Agnoea josephinae (Toll, 1956)

Synonyms
- Pseudatemelia josephinae (Toll, 1956); Tubuliferodes josephinae Toll, 1956; Tubuliferola josephinae Toll, 1956

= Agnoea josephinae =

Orange-headed tubic

Species of moth

Agnoea josephinae, the orange-headed tubic, is a species of moth in the family Lypusidae. It is found in Europe.

The wingspan is about 20 mm. The moth flies from June to August depending on the location.

The larvae feed on dead and decaying leaves.

This species was formerly in the genus Pseudatemelia.
