= Agnoea filiella =

Scientific classification
- Domain: Eukaryota
- Kingdom: Animalia
- Phylum: Arthropoda
- Class: Insecta
- Order: Lepidoptera
- Family: Lypusidae
- Subfamily: Lypusinae
- Genus: Agnoea
- Species: A. filiella

Binomial name
- Agnoea filiella (Staudinger, 1859)

Synonyms
- Pseudatemelia filiella (Staudinger, 1859); Borkhausenia filiella (Staudinger, 1859); Borkhausenia blidella Chrétien, 1915; Oecophora filiella Staudinger, 1859

Species of moth

Pseudatemelia filiella is a moth of the family Oecophoridae. It was described by Staudinger in 1859. It is found in France, Spain and Portugal.

Its wingspan is about 14 mm.

This species was formerly in the genus Pseudatemelia.
