= Agnoea lavandulae =

Scientific classification
- Domain: Eukaryota
- Kingdom: Animalia
- Phylum: Arthropoda
- Class: Insecta
- Order: Lepidoptera
- Family: Lypusidae
- Subfamily: Lypusinae
- Genus: Agnoea
- Species: A. lavandulae

Binomial name
- Agnoea lavandulae (J. J. Mann, 1855)

Synonyms
- Pseudatemelia lavandulae (Mann, 1855); Borkhausenia ardosiella (Constant, 1889); Borkhausenia lavandulae (Mann, 1855); Borkhausenia pulverisquamis Walsingham, 1898; Oecophora ardosiella Constant, 1889; Oecophora lavandulae Mann, 1855

Species of moth

Agnoea lavandulae is a species of moth in the family Lypusidae. It is found on Sardinia and Corsica.

This species was formerly in the genus Pseudatemelia.
