= Agnoea subgilvida =

Scientific classification
- Domain: Eukaryota
- Kingdom: Animalia
- Phylum: Arthropoda
- Class: Insecta
- Order: Lepidoptera
- Family: Lypusidae
- Subfamily: Lypusinae
- Genus: Agnoea
- Species: A. subgilvida

Binomial name
- Agnoea subgilvida (Walsingham, 1901)

Synonyms
- Pseudatemelia subgilvida (Walsingham, 1901); Borkhausenia gypsozyga Meyrick, 1931; Borkhausenia subgilvida Walsingham, 1901; Tubuliferola subgilvida (Walsingham, 1901)

Species of moth

Agnoea subgilvida is a species of moth in the family Lypusidae, found on Corsica.

The wingspan is about 18 mm. The forewings are pale cinereous, evenly suffused with pale greyish fuscous. The hindwings are greyish.

This species was formerly in the genus Pseudatemelia.
