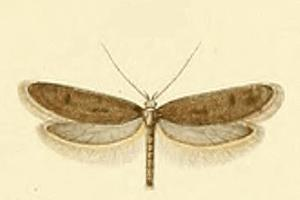

Scientific classification
- Domain: Eukaryota
- Kingdom: Animalia
- Phylum: Arthropoda
- Class: Insecta
- Order: Lepidoptera
- Family: Lypusidae
- Subfamily: Lypusinae
- Genus: Agnoea
- Species: A. fuscifrontella

Binomial name
- Agnoea fuscifrontella (Constant, 1884)

Synonyms
- Pseudatemelia fuscifrontella (Constant, 1884); Agnoea evanescens (Walsingham, 1901); Blastobasis evanescens Walsingham, 1901; Borkhausenia fuscifrontella (Constant, 1884); Oecophora fuscifrontella Constant, 1884

= Agnoea fuscifrontella =

Species of moth

Agnoea fuscifrontella is a species of moth in the family Lypusidae, found on Corsica.

Its wingspan is about 19 mm.

This species was formerly in the genus Pseudatemelia.
