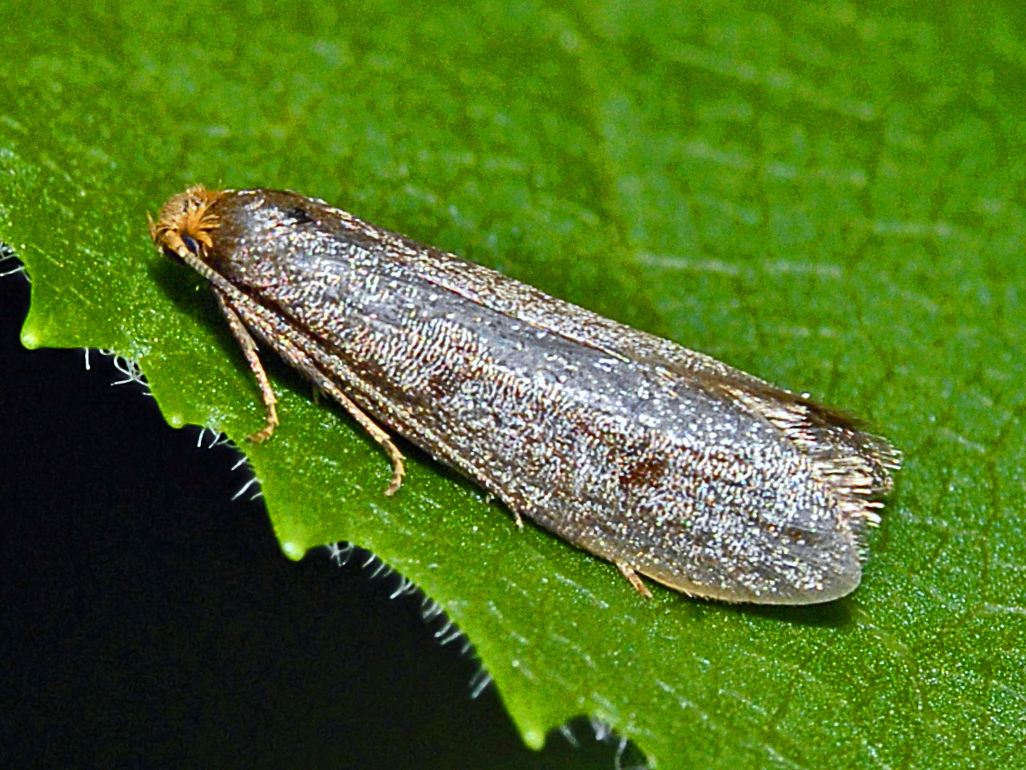
- Agnoea flavifrontella

Scientific classification
- Domain: Eukaryota
- Kingdom: Animalia
- Phylum: Arthropoda
- Class: Insecta
- Order: Lepidoptera
- Family: Lypusidae
- Subfamily: Lypusinae
- Genus: Agnoea; Walsingham, 1907

Subgenera
- Agnoea Walsingham, 1907; Tubuliferodes Toll, 1956

Synonyms
- Pseudatemelia Rebel, 1910; Tubulifera Spuler, 1910; Tubuliferodes Toll, 1956; Tubuliferola Strand, 1917

= Agnoea =

Genus of moths

Agnoea is a genus of butterflies in the moth family Lypusidae. There are more than 20 described species in Agnoea.

== Taxonomy ==
Recent research has shown that the genus Pseudatemelia is one of those close to Lypusa, the type of the family Lypusidae. As a result, the genus Pseudatemelia has been dissolved and the species previously assigned to it transferred to the genus Agnoea.

== Distribution ==
These moths are present in most of Europe, in the eastern Palearctic realm, in the Near East, and in North Africa.

== Species ==
These 25 species belong to the genus Agnoea:

- Subgenus Agnoea (Agnoea) Rebel, 1910
  - Agnoea aeneella (Rebel, 1910)
  - Agnoea amparoella (Vives, 1986)
  - Agnoea colurnella (Mann, 1867)
  - Agnoea danguni Sohn & Lvovsky, 2021
  - Agnoea detrimentella (Staudinger, 1859)
  - Agnoea emarella Gastón & Vives, 2020
  - Agnoea filiella (Staudinger, 1859)
  - Agnoea flavifrontella (Denis & Schiffermüller, 1775) (Yellow-headed Tubic)
  - Agnoea fuscifrontella (Constant, 1884)
  - Agnoea kurentzovi (Lvovsky, 2001)
  - Agnoea latipennella (Jäckh, 1959)
  - Agnoea lavandulae (Mann, 1855)
  - Agnoea lvovskyi Gastón & Vives, 2020
  - Agnoea nonscriptella Corley, 2014
  - Agnoea pallidella (Jäckh, 1972)
  - Agnoea semifuscata (Walsingham, 1911)
  - Agnoea subfiliella Lvovsky, 2018
  - Agnoea subgilvida (Walsingham, 1901)
  - Agnoea subochreella (Doubleday, 1859) (Straw-coloured Tubic)
  - Agnoea synchrozella (Jäckh, 1959)
  - Agnoea xanthosoma (Rebel, 1900)
- Subgenus Agnoea (Tubuliferodes) Strand, 1917
  - Agnoea digitiella Kim & Lee, 2020
  - Agnoea elsae (Svensson, 1982)
  - Agnoea josephinae (Toll, 1956) (Orange-headed Tubic)
  - Agnoea langohri (Palm, 1990)
