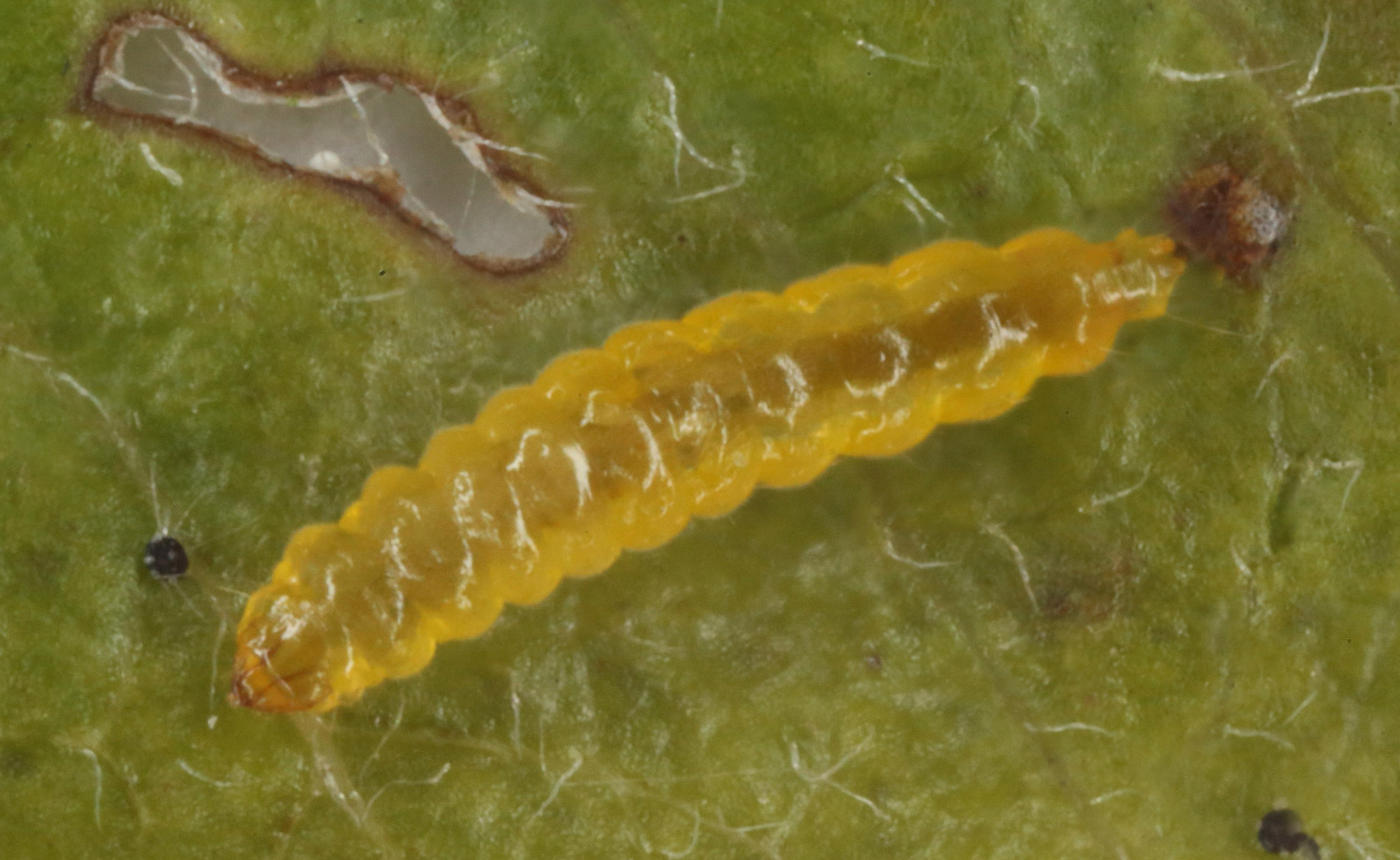

Scientific classification
- Kingdom: Animalia
- Phylum: Arthropoda
- Clade: Pancrustacea
- Class: Insecta
- Order: Lepidoptera
- Family: Nepticulidae
- Genus: Stigmella
- Species: S. perpygmaeella

Binomial name
- Stigmella perpygmaeella (Doubleday, 1859)

Synonyms
- Tinea pygmaeella Haworth, 1828; Nepticula perpygmaeella Doubleday, 1859

= Stigmella perpygmaeella =

Species of moth

Stigmella perpygmaeella is a moth of the family Nepticulidae, found in most of Europe, east to Russia. The larvae mine the leaves of hawthorns.

== Description ==
The wingspan is 5–6 mm. The thick erect hairs on the head vertex are yellow-white and the collar is also yellow-white. The antennal eyecaps are yellow-white. The forewings are dark grey brown with purple at the apex. Hindwings are grey.

== Biology ==
Adults are on wing in May and August.

== Life cycle ==
Ovum

Eggs are usually laid on the upperside of a hawthorn leaf, beside the midrib.

Larvae

The larvae are yellow with a brown head. They feed on woodland hawthorn (Crataegus laevigata) and common hawthorn (Crataegus monogyna), mining their leaves. Mines can be found in July and October.

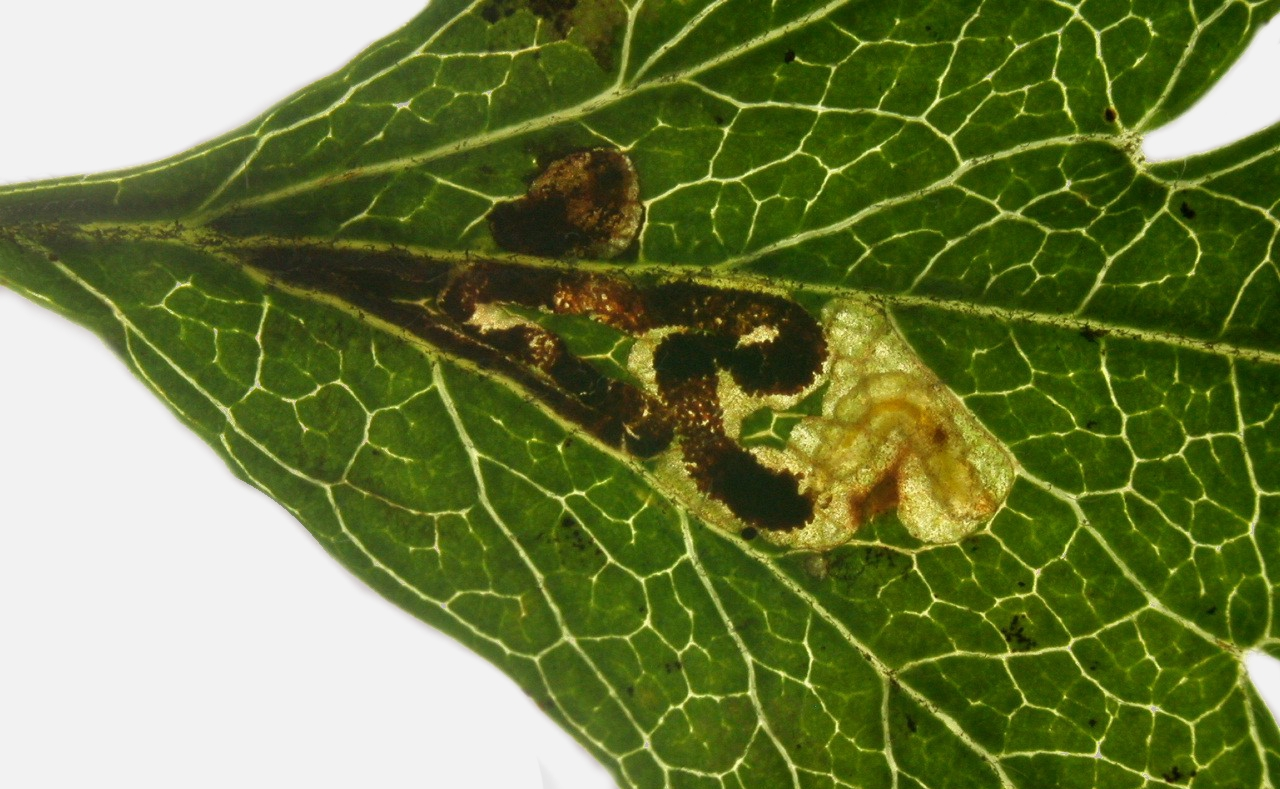
Stigmella perpygmaeella mine.

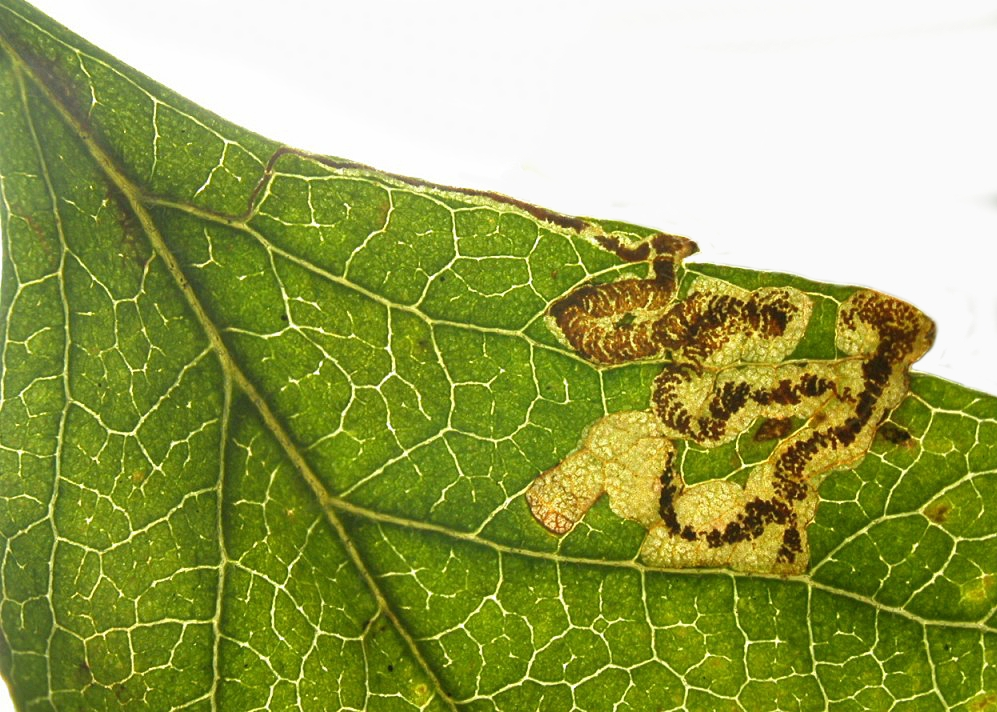
Stigmella crataegella mine. Note the initial narrow gallery.

Pupa

In a dull pink cocoon, spun in detritus.

== Distribution ==
Stigmella perpygmaeella is found in most of Europe, from Ireland, east to Russia.

== Etymology ==
Stigmella perpygmaeella was originally named pygmaeus, (i.e. a small size) by the English entomologist, Adrian Haworth in 1828, from a specimen found in Chelsea, at that time in the county of Middlesex, England. As this name was already in use it was renamed by Henry Doubleday in 1859 with the specific name perpygmaeella. Haworth originally placed the moth in the genus, Tinea – a gnawing worm. Doubleday moved pygmaeus to the genus Nepticula – a grand daughter, the smallest member of a family (i.e. the small size of the moth) when he renamed it perpygmaeella. The genus Stigmella – ″stigma″, refers to the conspicuous (or occasionally metallic) small dot or a brand fascia on the forewing of many of the Stigmella species, or possibly the small size of the moths.
