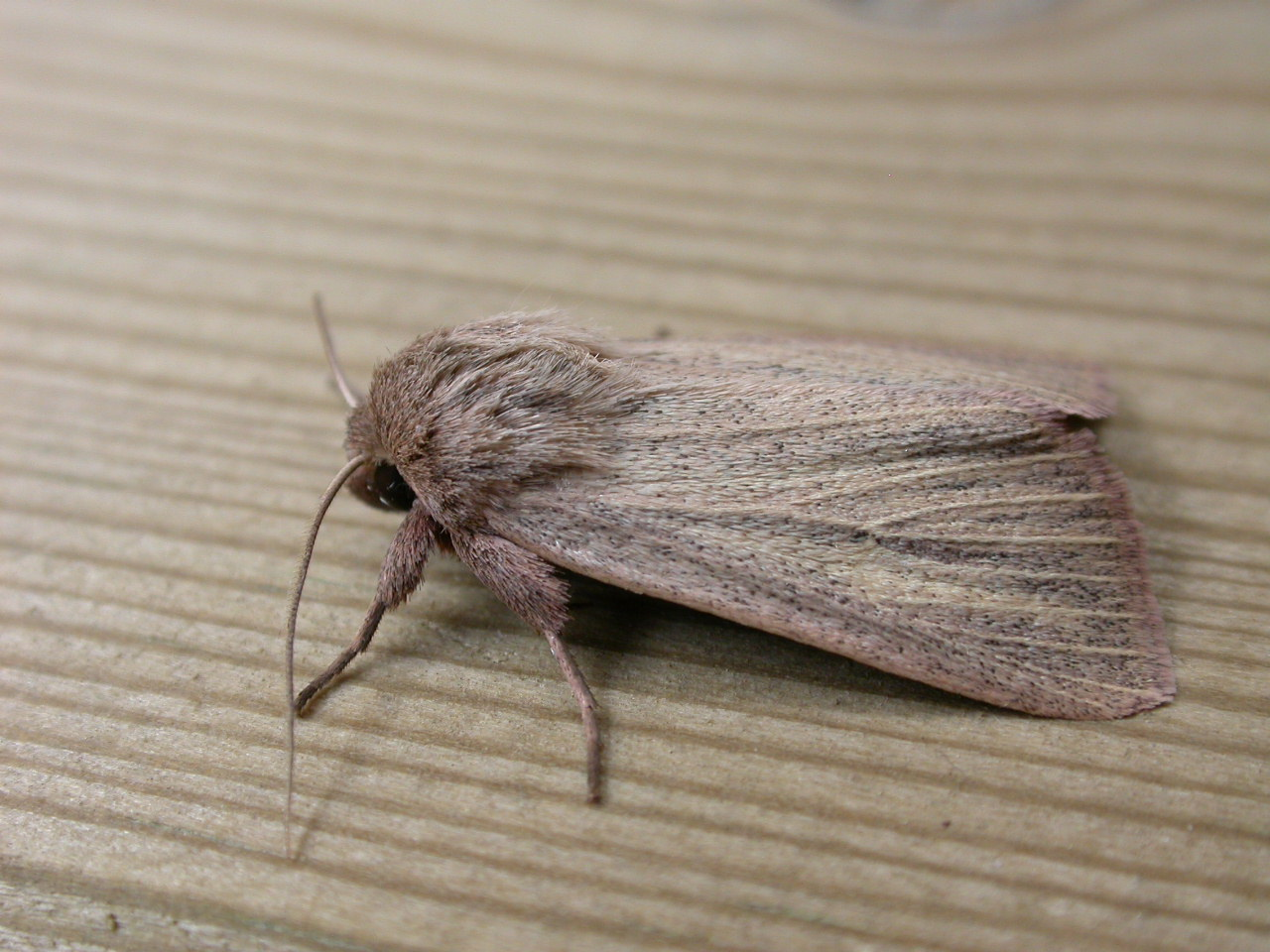

Scientific classification
- Domain: Eukaryota
- Kingdom: Animalia
- Phylum: Arthropoda
- Class: Insecta
- Order: Lepidoptera
- Superfamily: Noctuoidea
- Family: Noctuidae
- Genus: Mythimna
- Species: M. pudorina

Binomial name
- Mythimna pudorina (Denis & Schiffermüller, 1775)

= Mythimna pudorina =

Striped wainscot

Species of moth

Mythimna pudorina, the striped wainscot, is a species of moth of the family Noctuidae. It is found in the Palearctic realm (Europe and all of Russia to Japan). Also Armenia, Asia Minor and eastern Siberia.

== Technical description and variation ==
The wingspan is 35–38 mm. Forewing flesh coloured ochreous densely dusted with grey atoms; the veins slightly paler; the upper half of cell and of submedian interval often paler without dusting, the streak in cell continued to margin; sometimes a darker streak in lower half of cell also continued to termen; hindwing dark grey, with pale fringe; -impudens Hbn. is a less marked grey form, without reddish tinge;- rufescens Tutt is a rare British form, bright rosy red, with pale grey dusting; striata Tutt darker, with the grey intervals blackish. See also Hacker et al.

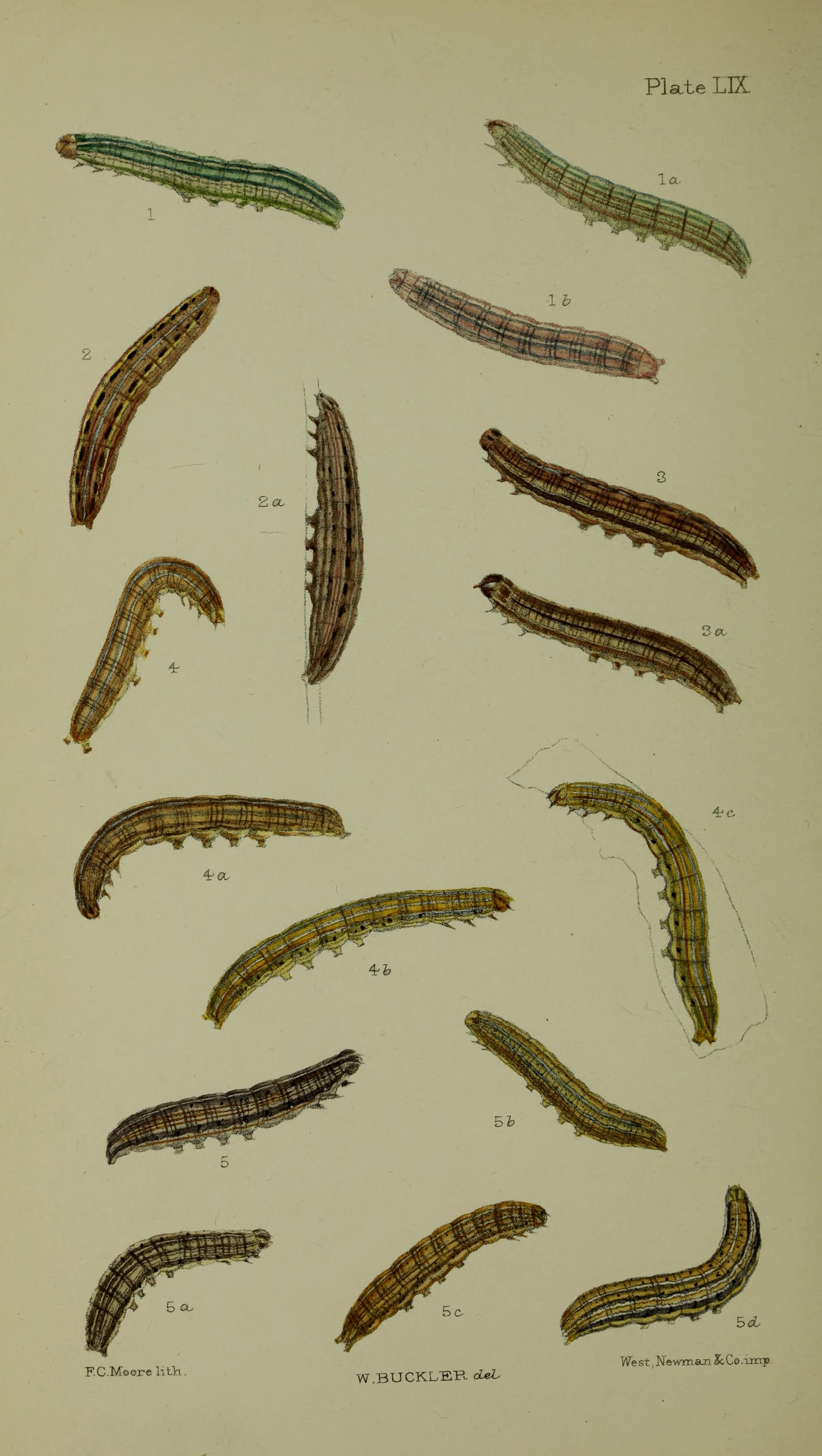
Figs 2, 2a larva after last moult

== Biology ==
The moth flies from June to August depending on the location.

Larva dirty yellowish white; dorsal line white; subdorsal also white, edged above with black; 3 fine whitish lateral lines and a narrow grey stripe containing the black spiracles. The larvae feed on various grasses, such as purple moor grass, Phragmites and reed canary grass.
