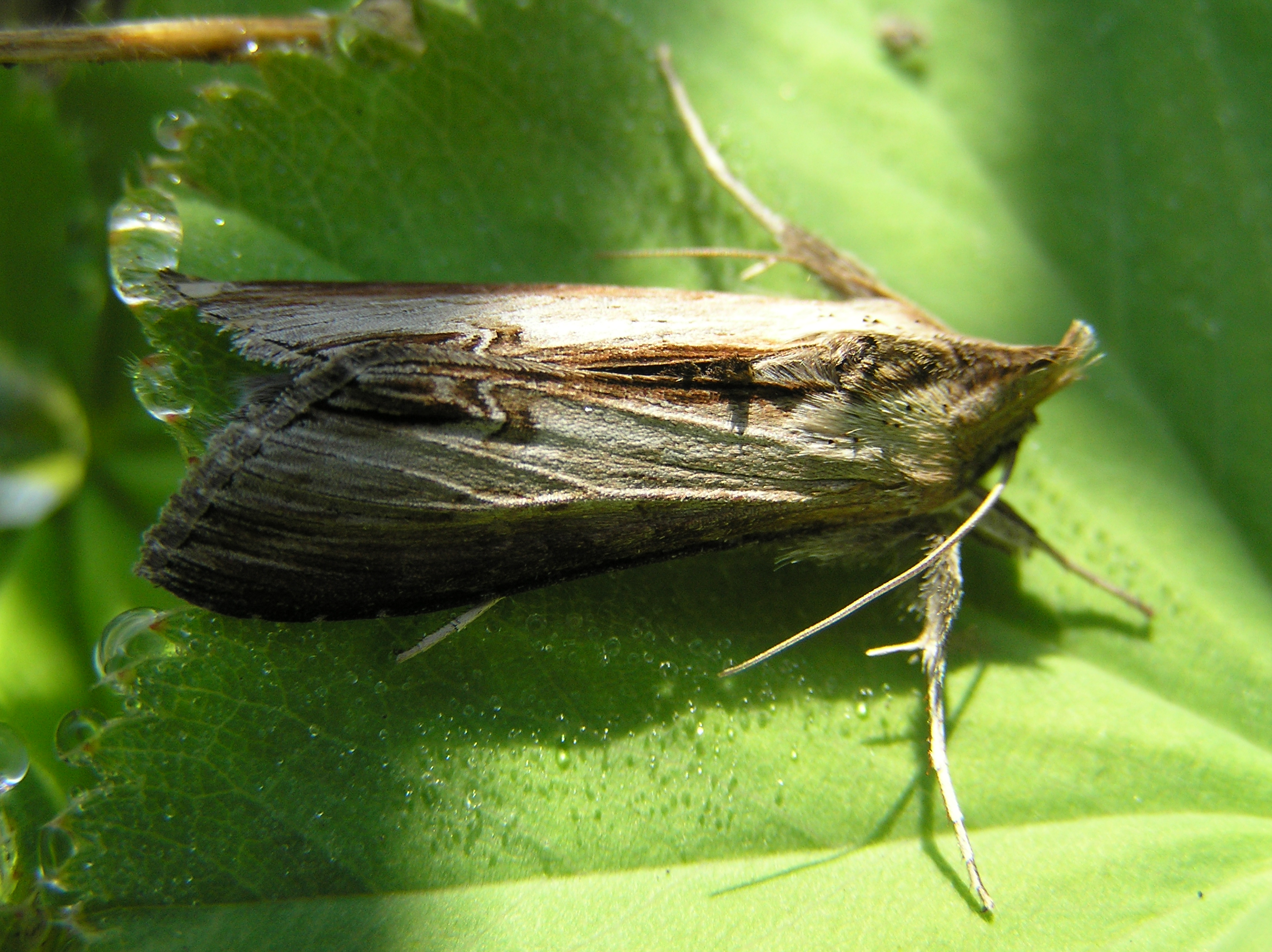

Scientific classification
- Domain: Eukaryota
- Kingdom: Animalia
- Phylum: Arthropoda
- Class: Insecta
- Order: Lepidoptera
- Superfamily: Noctuoidea
- Family: Noctuidae
- Genus: Cucullia
- Species: C. asteris

Binomial name
- Cucullia asteris (Denis & Schiffermüller, 1775)

= Cucullia asteris =

Species of moth

Cucullia asteris, or star-wort, is a moth of the family Noctuidae. The species was first described by Michael Denis and Ignaz Schiffermüller in 1775. It is found through the Palearctic including Japan.

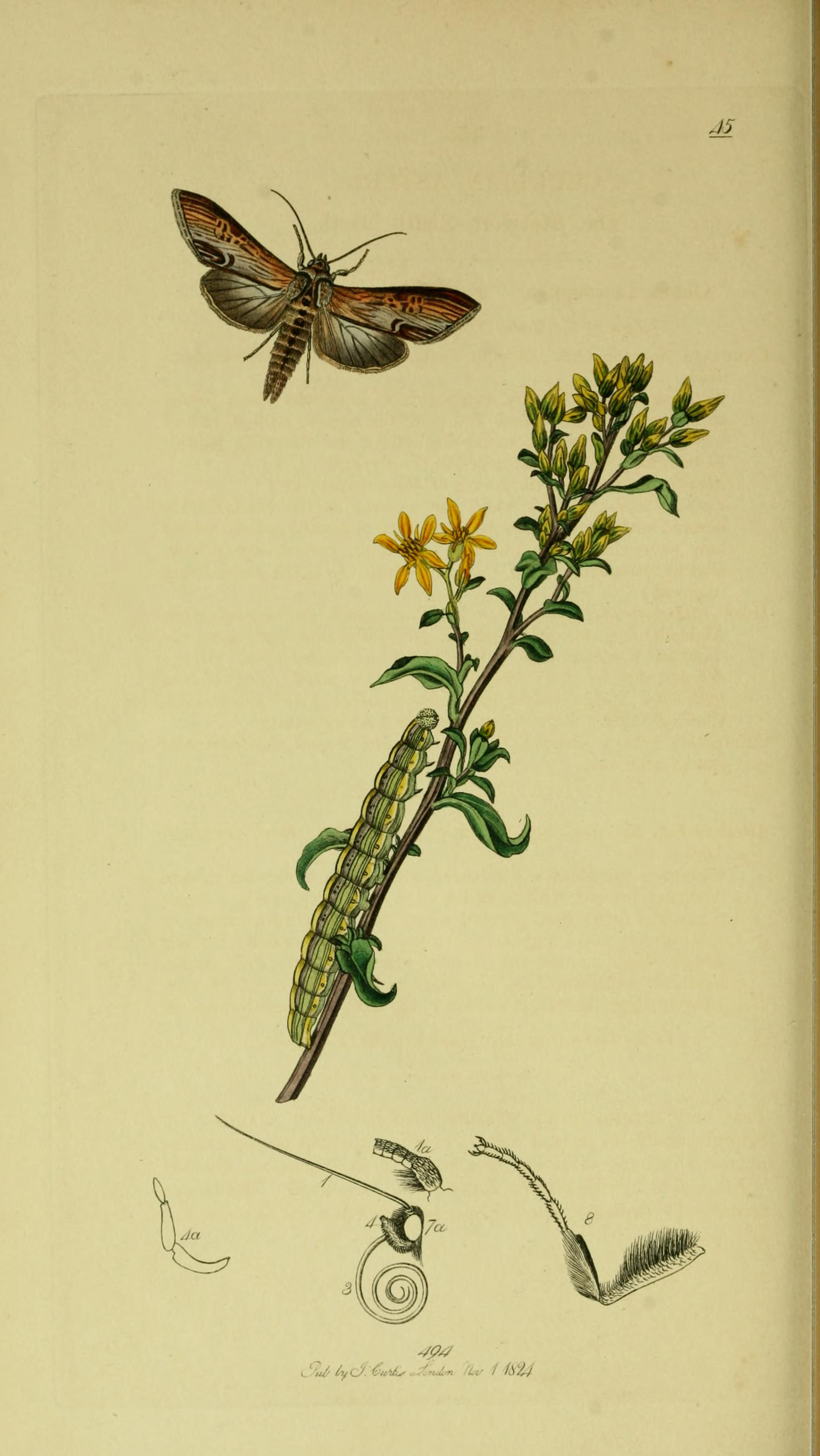
Illustration from John Curtis's British Entomology Volume 5

Larva feeding on goldenrod

== Technical description and variation ==
C. asteris Schiff (27 e). Forewing pale grey; costal area dull reddish brown; the cell and space beyond rufous tinged: stigmata obscure, incompletely defined by brown, the reniform with a dark curved streak at its lower end; outer line defined only below vein 2 on submedian fold where it forms a double red-brown lunule, followed by a white one beyond which is a thick brown blotch or two streaks; both the inner and outer lines are marked by very oblique dark brown streaks on inner margin; hindwing brownish, the basal half dull whitish grey with dark veins. Larva yellow green; dorsal, subdorsal, and spiracular lines yellow with black edges; head yellow brown, with black spots. The wingspan is 45–52 mm.

== Biology ==
The moth flies from May to September depending on the location.

The larvae feed on Aster tripolium, goldenrod, and other Aster species.
