= Stigmella diniensis =

Scientific classification
- Kingdom: Animalia
- Phylum: Arthropoda
- Clade: Pancrustacea
- Class: Insecta
- Order: Lepidoptera
- Family: Nepticulidae
- Genus: Stigmella
- Species: S. diniensis

Binomial name
- Stigmella diniensis (Klimesch, 1975)

Synonyms
- Nepticula diniensis Klimesch, 1975

Species of moth

Stigmella diniensis is a moth of the family Nepticulidae. It is endemic to southern France.

The length of the forewings is 1.3-1.6 mm for males and 1.5-1.6 mm for females. Adults are on wing in April, May and September. There are probably several generations per year.

The larvae feed on Fumana ericoides, Fumana procumbens and possibly Helianthemum. They mine the leaves of their host plant.
