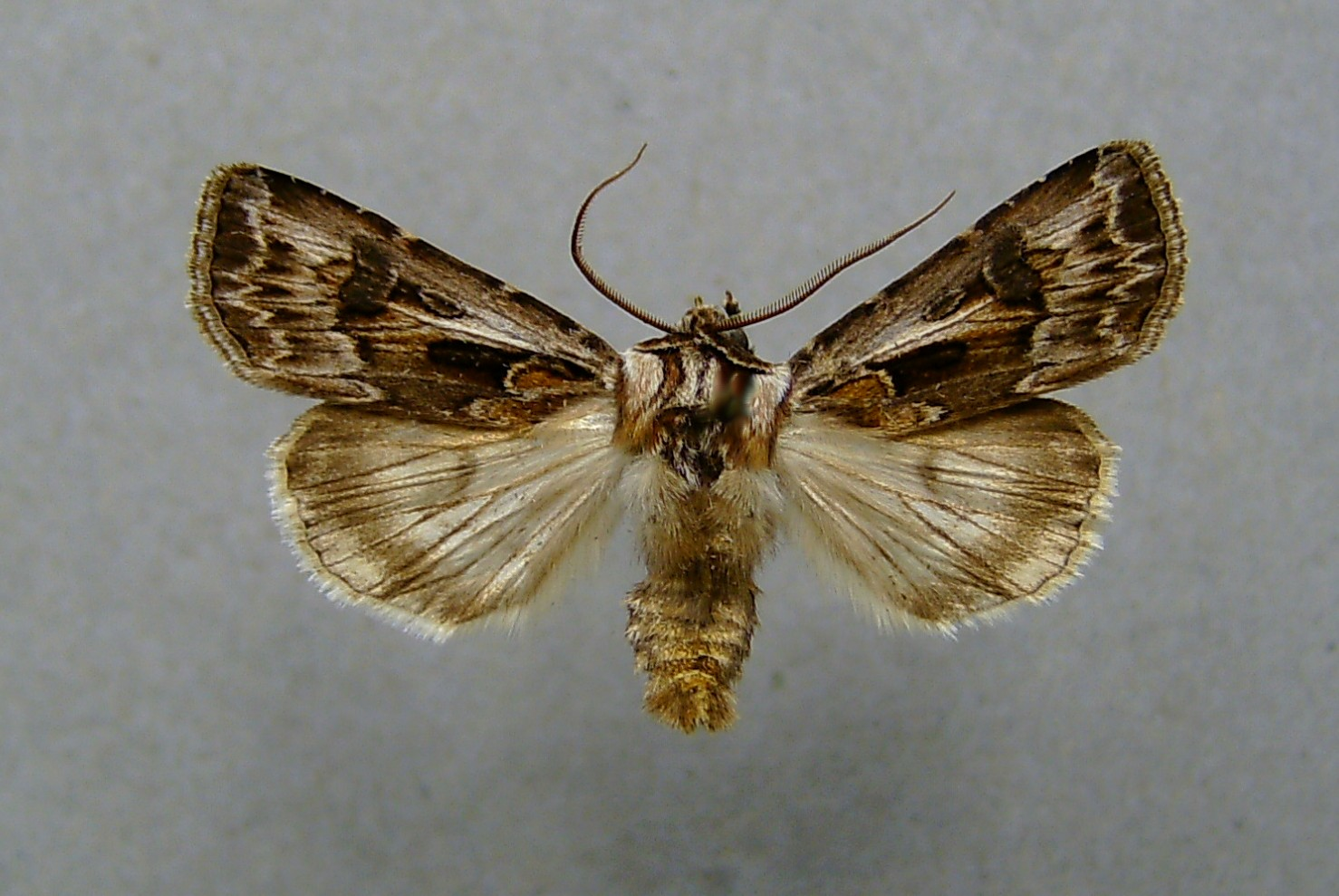

Scientific classification
- Kingdom: Animalia
- Phylum: Arthropoda
- Clade: Pancrustacea
- Class: Insecta
- Order: Lepidoptera
- Superfamily: Noctuoidea
- Family: Noctuidae
- Genus: Agrotis
- Species: A. vestigialis

Binomial name
- Agrotis vestigialis (Hufnagel, 1766)

Synonyms
- Phalaena vestigialis; Scotia vestigialis; Rhyacia vestigialis

= Agrotis vestigialis =

Archer's dart

Species of moth

Agrotis vestigialis, the archer's dart, is a moth of the family Noctuidae. The species was first described by Johann Siegfried Hufnagel in 1766. It is found in most of the Palearctic realm from Ireland east, through to Russia, Siberia, the Altai Mountains and the Amur region, and is also present in the Mediterranean Basin. It is absent from the north of Finland and Norway.

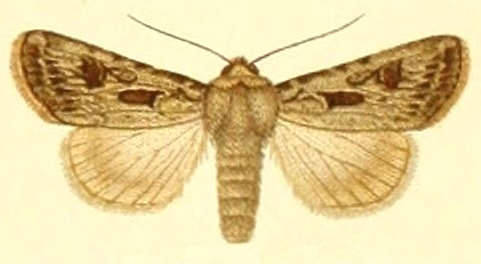
Male

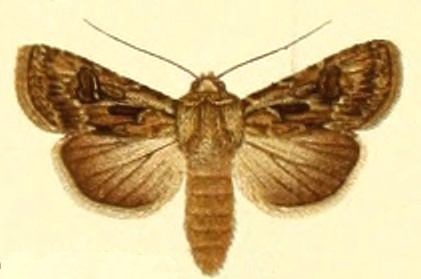
Female

== Description ==
The wingspan is 30–35 mm. Forewing greyish ochreous, with olive-fuscous shading varied with whitish; stigmata large, outlined in black; claviform elongate, orbicular and reniform with fuscous centres in a pale ring; orbicular small, often conjoined to reniform; submarginal line preceded by black dentations; hindwing white, with brownish veins and margin; the female always darker, with the hindwing wholly brownish. In the typical form the markings are distinct on a pale grey ground; — ab. sagittiferus Haw. differs only in having the ground dark fuscous; — ab. clavis Esp. is pale reddish ochreous; the forms in which the markings are more or less obsolete differ similarly in colouration; — thus ab. signata has a pale grey ground; — ab. trigonalis Esp. is a small fuscous form with the stigmata large and outer margin dark; — and ab. nigra Tutt is blackish fuscous with the course of the median vein pale; — in ab. lineolata Tutt the wedge-shaped markings, usually submarginal only, extend through to the outer margin.

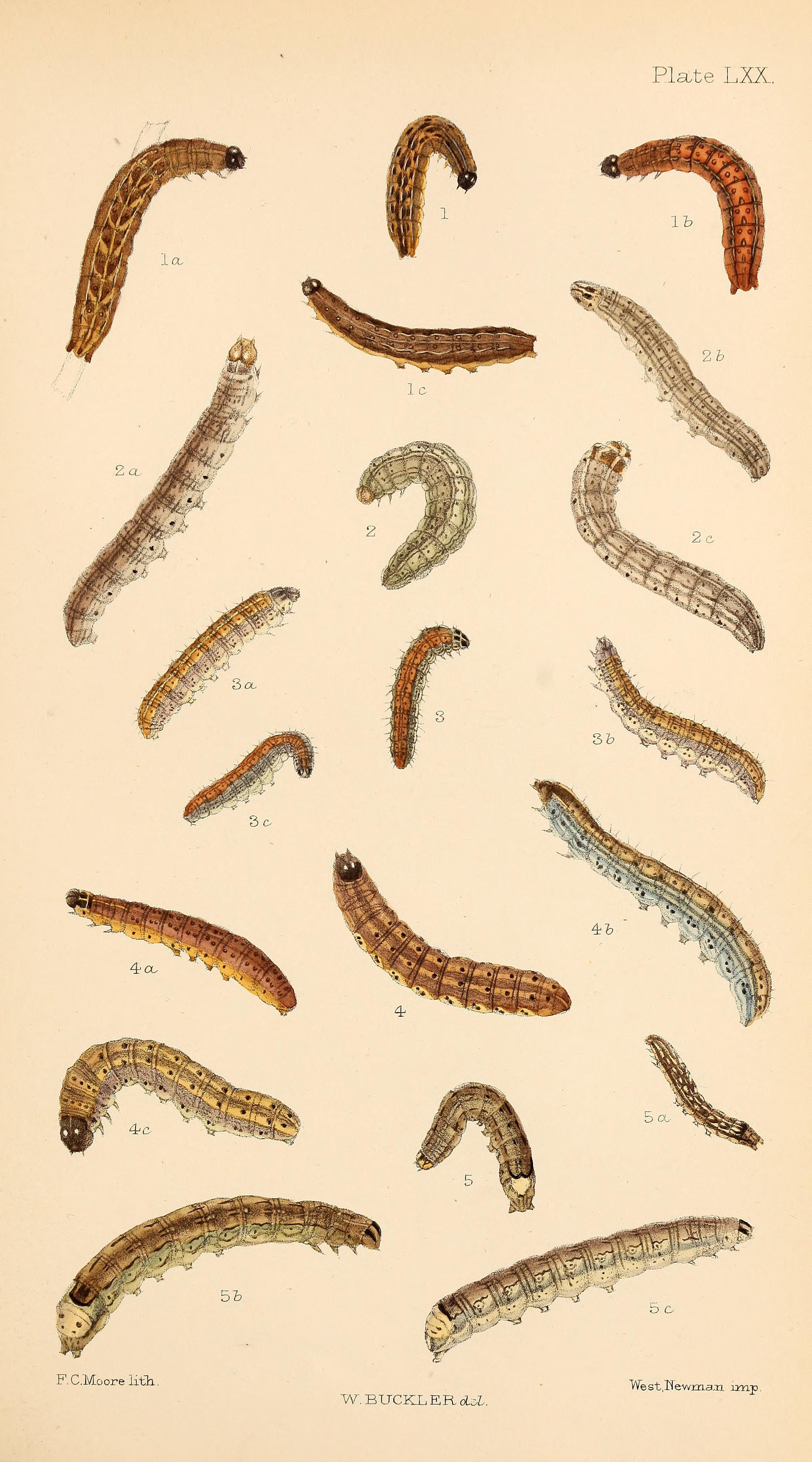
Figs 2,2a,2b larva after last moult

== Biology ==
Adults are on wing from July to September depending on the location. The larva is earth-grey, occasionally greenish or reddish. It has a fine, dark, double dorsal line and pale, enclosed with darker colour lateral stripes. The pupa is reddish-brown, the pointed cremaster has two close thorns The larvae feed on Galium and Stellaria species. in sandy areas.

== Similar species ==
- Agrotis graslini Rambur, 1848,
- Agrotis endogaea Boisduval, 1837
- Agrotis sabulosa Rambur, 1839
