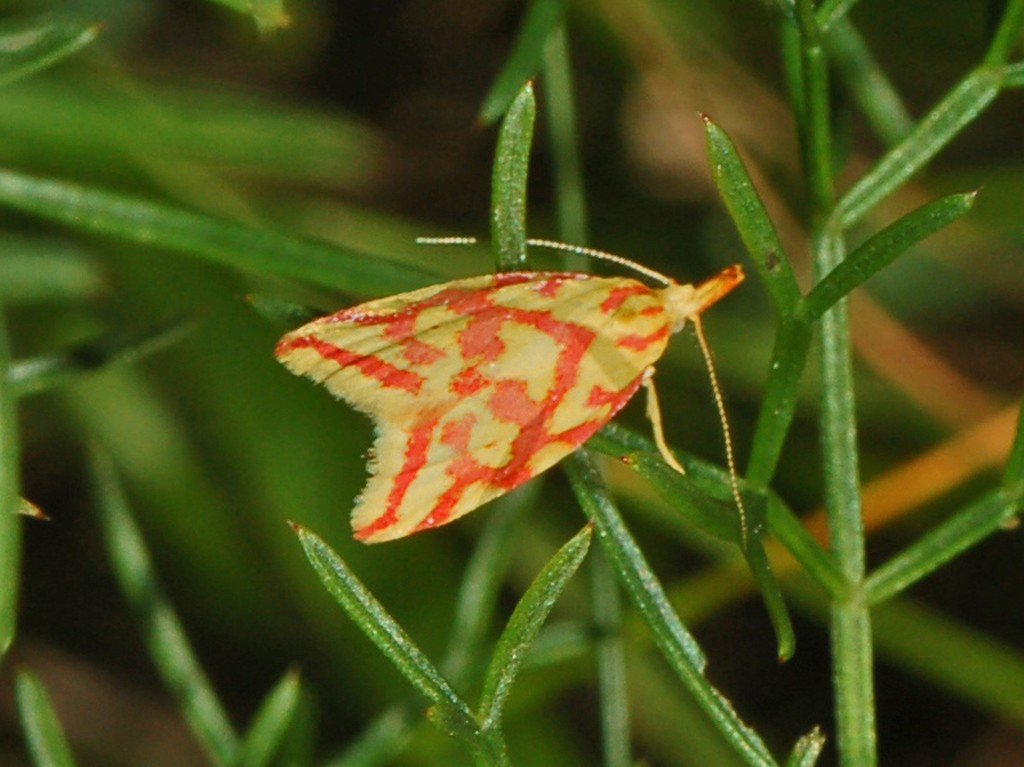
- Hypercallia citrinalis

Scientific classification
- Kingdom: Animalia
- Phylum: Arthropoda
- Class: Insecta
- Order: Lepidoptera
- Superfamily: Gelechioidea
- Family: Oecophoridae (disputed)
- Subfamily: Amphisbatinae (but see text)

Genera
- Several, see text

Synonyms
- Amphisbatidae; Amphisbatini (but see text)

= Amphisbatinae =

Subfamily of moths

The Amphisbatinae was a small subfamily of moths in the superfamily Gelechioidea. Like their relatives therein, their exact relationships are not yet very well resolved. The present lineage is often included in the Depressariinae as a tribe Amphisbatini, though more often within the context of a "splitting" approach to Gelechioidea systematics and taxonomy, wherein the Depressariinae are elevated to full family rank and the Amphisbatinae are treated as a subfamily therein. An even more extremely split-up layout even treats the Amphisbatinae as full family Amphisbatidae. In the scheme used here, the Amphisbatinae are included in the Oecophoridae as a subfamily alongside the Depressariinae.

That nonwithstanding, the delimitation of Amphisbatinae versus the Depressariinae and Oecophorinae is problematic, and several individual genera have been moved from one to the other. As regards subdivisions, the Amphisbatinae are commonly divided into the tribes Amphisbatini, Fuchsiini, Hypercalliini and Telechrysidini. But neither are these subdivisions as firmly delimited as it might seem, nor are they particularly diverse (several Amphisbatinae taxa are monotypic). Thus, the Amphisbatinae are here not divided into tribes pending the availability of more thorough phylogenetic studies and better information on the subfamily's scope and relationships.

More recently, it was discovered that the enigmatic genus Lypusa, traditionally held to be a monotypic family of Tineoidea, is closely related to Amphisbatis and Pseudatemelia. The name for the combined group is to be determined.

== Selected genera ==
Genera of Amphisbatinae include:

- Amphisbatis Zeller, 1870
- Anchinia Hübner, 1825 (Oecophorinae?)
- Eupragia Walsingham, 1911
- Fuchsia Spuler, 1910
- Hypercallia Stephens, 1829 (Oecophorinae?)
- Paratemelia
- Pseudatemelia
- Telechrysis Toll, 1956 (Oecophorinae?)
