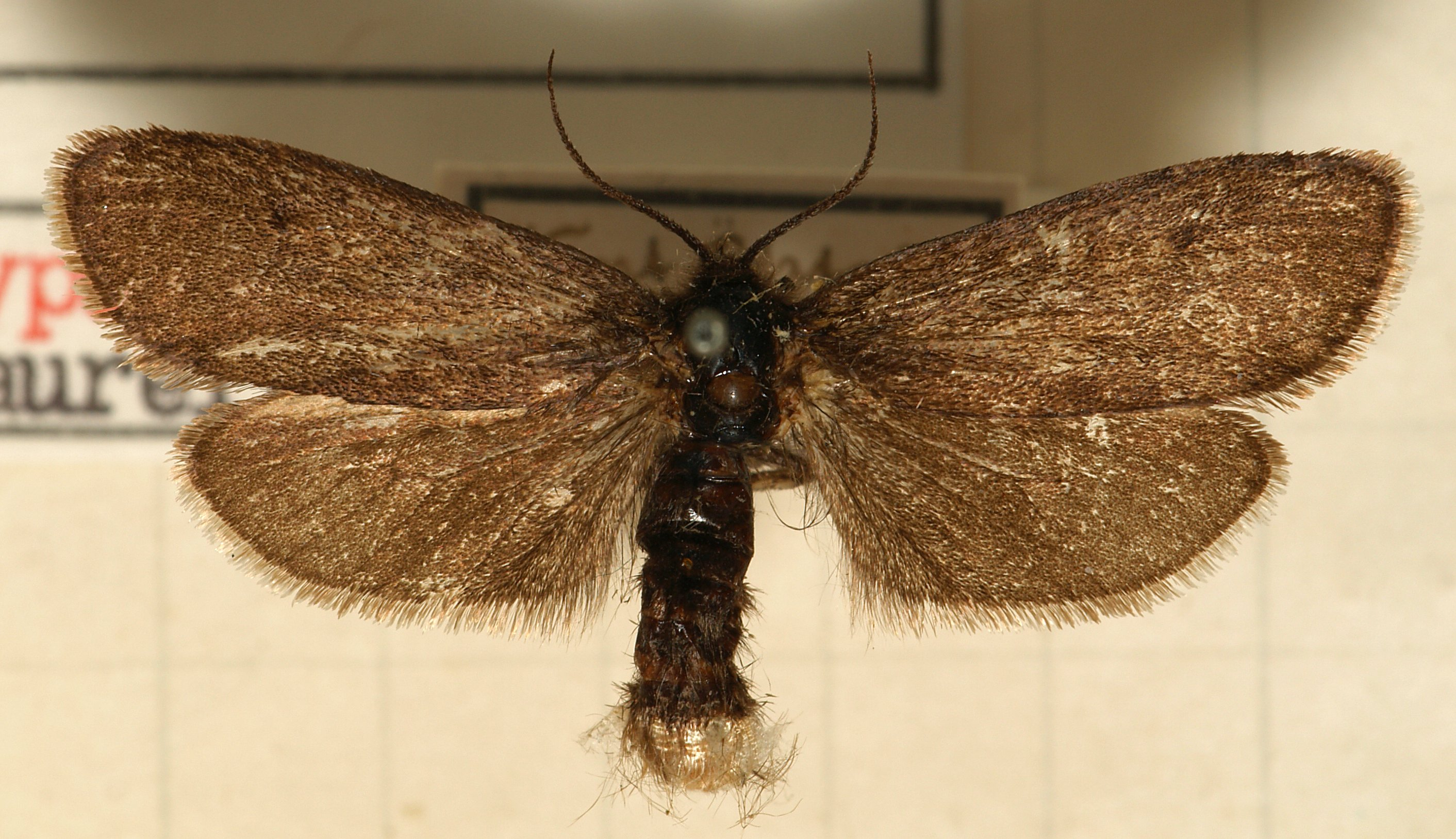

Scientific classification
- Domain: Eukaryota
- Kingdom: Animalia
- Phylum: Arthropoda
- Class: Insecta
- Order: Lepidoptera
- Family: Lypusidae
- Genus: Lypusa
- Species: L. maurella

Binomial name
- Lypusa maurella (Denis & Schiffermüller, 1775)

Synonyms
- Tinea maurella Denis & Schiffermuller 1775

= Lypusa maurella =

Species of moth

Lypusa maurella is a moth of the Lypusidae family. It is found in most of Europe.

The wingspan is 7–12 mm. Adults are on wing from May to June.

The larvae feed on algae and mosses. They live in a leaf tube that is constructed by rolling a part of the leaf into a slightly conical tube.
