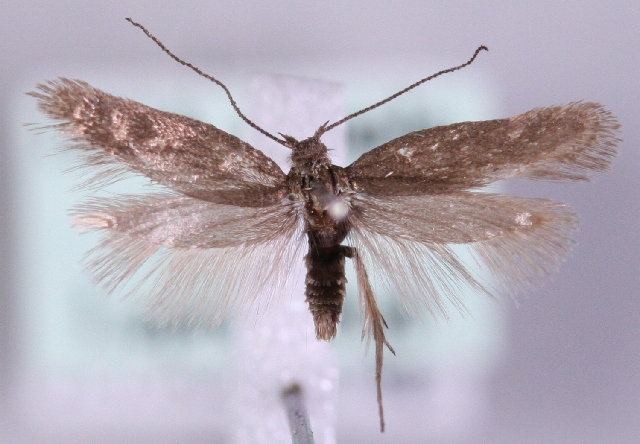

Scientific classification
- Kingdom: Animalia
- Phylum: Arthropoda
- Clade: Pancrustacea
- Class: Insecta
- Order: Lepidoptera
- Family: Lypusidae
- Subfamily: Lypusinae
- Genus: Amphisbatis; Zeller, 1870
- Species: A. incongruella

Binomial name
- Amphisbatis incongruella Stainton, 1849

= Amphisbatis =

Genus of moths

Amphisbatis is a monotypic genus of moths belonging to the family Lypusidae. The only species is Amphisbatis incongruella. It is found in Europe.

The wingspan is about 11 mm. The moth flies from March to May depending on the location.

The larvae probably feed on Calluna and Thymus species.
