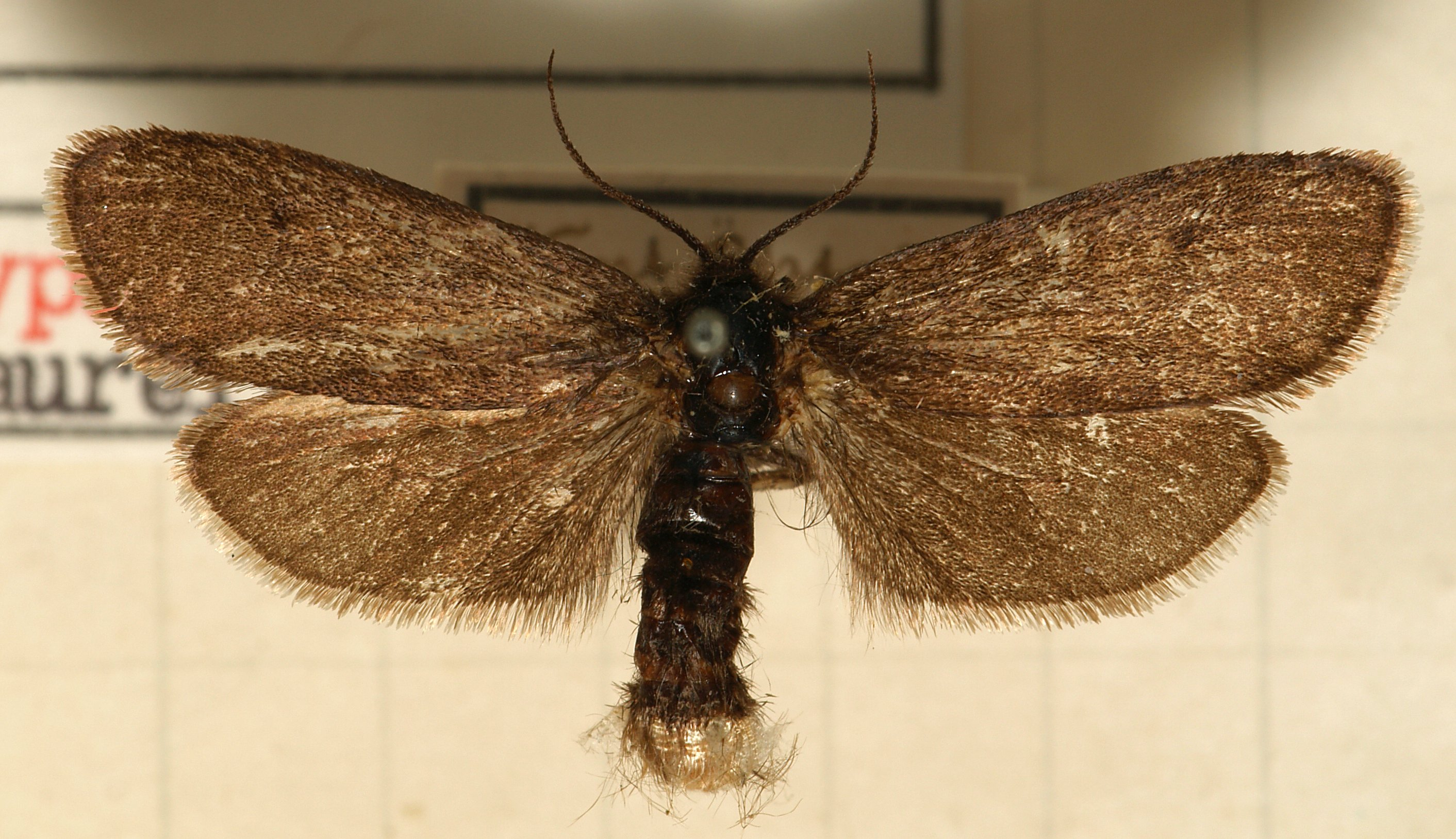
- Lypusa maurella

Scientific classification
- Kingdom: Animalia
- Phylum: Arthropoda
- Clade: Pancrustacea
- Class: Insecta
- Order: Lepidoptera
- Family: Lypusidae
- Genus: Lypusa; Zeller, 1852

= Lypusa =

Genus of moths

Lypusa is a genus of moths of the Lypusidae family, traditionally held to be a monotypic lineage of Tineoidea. However, it may actually belong to the same lineage of Gelechioidea as the Amphisbatinae (or Amphisbatidae).

The genus contains only 2 known species:

- Lypusa maurella
- Lypusa tokari
