= Lypusinae =

Scientific classification
- Domain: Eukaryota
- Kingdom: Animalia
- Phylum: Arthropoda
- Class: Insecta
- Order: Lepidoptera
- Family: Lypusidae
- Subfamily: Lypusinae; Herrich-Schäffer, 1857

Genera
- See text

Subfamily of moths

Lypusinae is a subfamily of moths in the Lypusidae family.

== Taxonomy and systematics ==
- Lypusa Zeller, 1852
- Paralypusa Lvovsky, 2012

The following genera are alternatively placed elsewhere:

- Paratemelia Lvovsky, 2007
- Amphisbatis Zeller, 1870
- Pseudatemelia Rebel in Rebel & Schawerda, 1910
