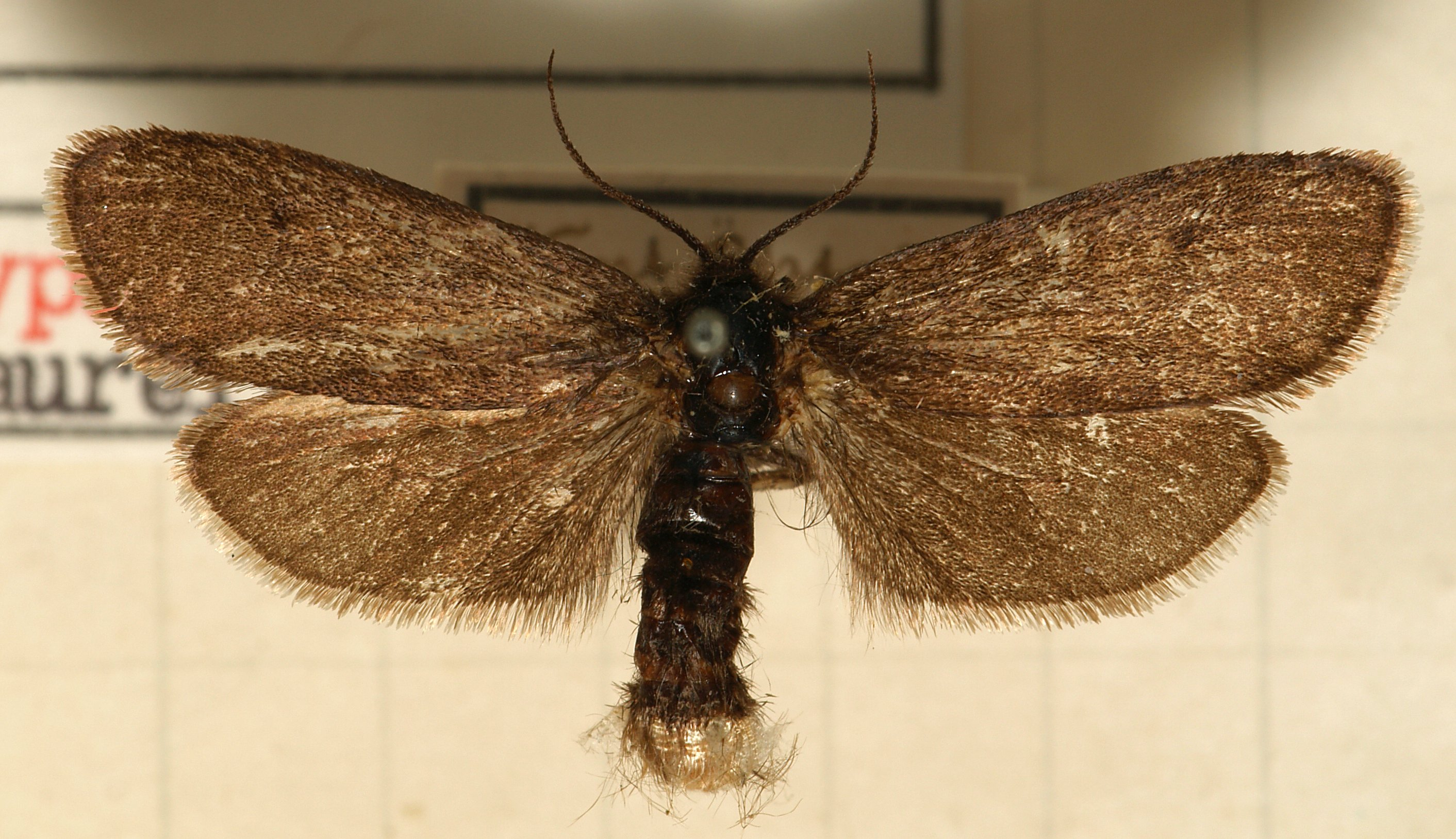
- Lypusa maurella

Scientific classification
- Kingdom: Animalia
- Phylum: Arthropoda
- Clade: Pancrustacea
- Class: Insecta
- Order: Lepidoptera
- Infraorder: Heteroneura
- Clade: Eulepidoptera
- Clade: Ditrysia
- Clade: Apoditrysia
- Superfamily: Gelechioidea
- Family: Lypusidae; Herrich-Schäffer, 1857

Subfamilies
- See text

= Lypusidae =

Family of moths

Lypusidae is a family of moths in the superfamily Gelechioidea.

== History of classification ==
The group was traditionally considered monotypic (containing only the genus Lypusa with two species) and belonging in the primitive moth superfamily Tineoidea. Previous research suggested that Lypusa was so closely related to Amphisbatis – the type genus of the gelechioid subfamily Amphisbatinae (or family Amphisbatidae) – that these groups were merged.

== Taxonomy and systematics ==
- Lypusinae Herrich-Schäffer, 1857
- Chimabachinae Heinemann, 1870
