= Eupithecia liguriata =

Scientific classification
- Domain: Eukaryota
- Kingdom: Animalia
- Phylum: Arthropoda
- Class: Insecta
- Order: Lepidoptera
- Family: Geometridae
- Genus: Eupithecia
- Species: E. liguriata

Binomial name
- Eupithecia liguriata Millière, 1884

Synonyms
- Eupithecia bordigherata Dietze, 1913; Eupithecia roderaria Standfuss, 1888; Eupithecia roederaria

Species of moth

Eupithecia liguriata is a moth in the family Geometridae. It is found in Italy, France and on the Iberian Peninsula, as well as in North Africa.

The larvae feed on Sedum dasyphyllum.

== Subspecies ==
- Eupithecia liguriata liguriata
- Eupithecia liguriata ketama Herbulot, 1981
