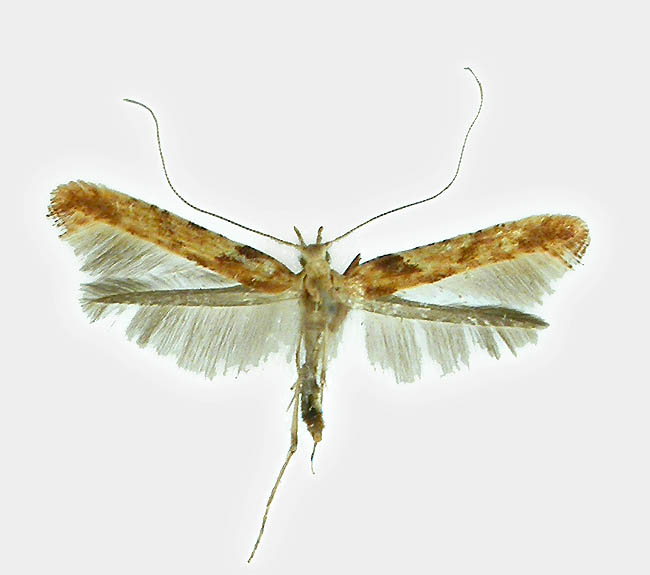

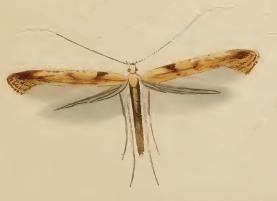

Scientific classification
- Domain: Eukaryota
- Kingdom: Animalia
- Phylum: Arthropoda
- Class: Insecta
- Order: Lepidoptera
- Family: Gracillariidae
- Genus: Caloptilia
- Species: C. hemidactylella

Binomial name
- Caloptilia hemidactylella (Denis & Schiffermüller, 1775)

Synonyms
- Tinea hemidactylella Denis & Schiffermüller, 1775

= Caloptilia hemidactylella =

Species of moth

Caloptilia hemidactylella is a moth of the family Gracillariidae. It is mostly found in central and northern Europe, although there are recent records from Belgium and the Netherlands. It is a rare species in Great Britain with no reliable records since the 1950s, when it was recorded in Gloucestershire. It is also believed to have been present in Northamptonshire in the 19th century.

Pieces of sycamore leaves rolled conically (3b and 3b*)

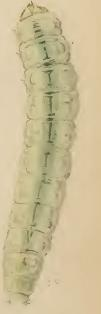
Larva

The wingspan is about 13 millimetres (0.51 in). Adults are on wing from September onwards.

The larvae feed on Acer campestre.
