= Scrobipalpa suasella =

Scientific classification
- Domain: Eukaryota
- Kingdom: Animalia
- Phylum: Arthropoda
- Class: Insecta
- Order: Lepidoptera
- Family: Gelechiidae
- Genus: Scrobipalpa
- Species: S. suasella

Binomial name
- Scrobipalpa suasella (Constant, 1895)

Synonyms
- Lita suasella Constant, 1895

Species of moth

Scrobipalpa suasella is a moth in the family Gelechiidae. It was described by Constant in 1895. It is found in southern France, Portugal, and Spain, as well as on Sardinia.

The wingspan is 8–9 mm (0.31–0.35 in).

The larvae feed on Staehelina dubia. They mine the leaves of their host plant.
