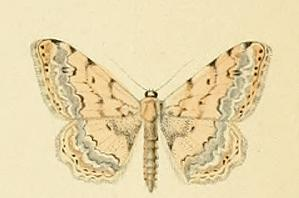

Scientific classification
- Domain: Eukaryota
- Kingdom: Animalia
- Phylum: Arthropoda
- Class: Insecta
- Order: Lepidoptera
- Family: Geometridae
- Genus: Scopula
- Species: S. honestata

Binomial name
- Scopula honestata (Mabille, 1869)

Synonyms
- Acidalia honestata Mabille, 1869

= Scopula honestata =

Species of geometer moth in subfamily Sterrhinae

Scopula honestata is a moth of the family Geometridae. It is found on Corsica and Sardinia and in Italy.

The wingspan is 20–25 mm for males and 25–27 mm for females.
