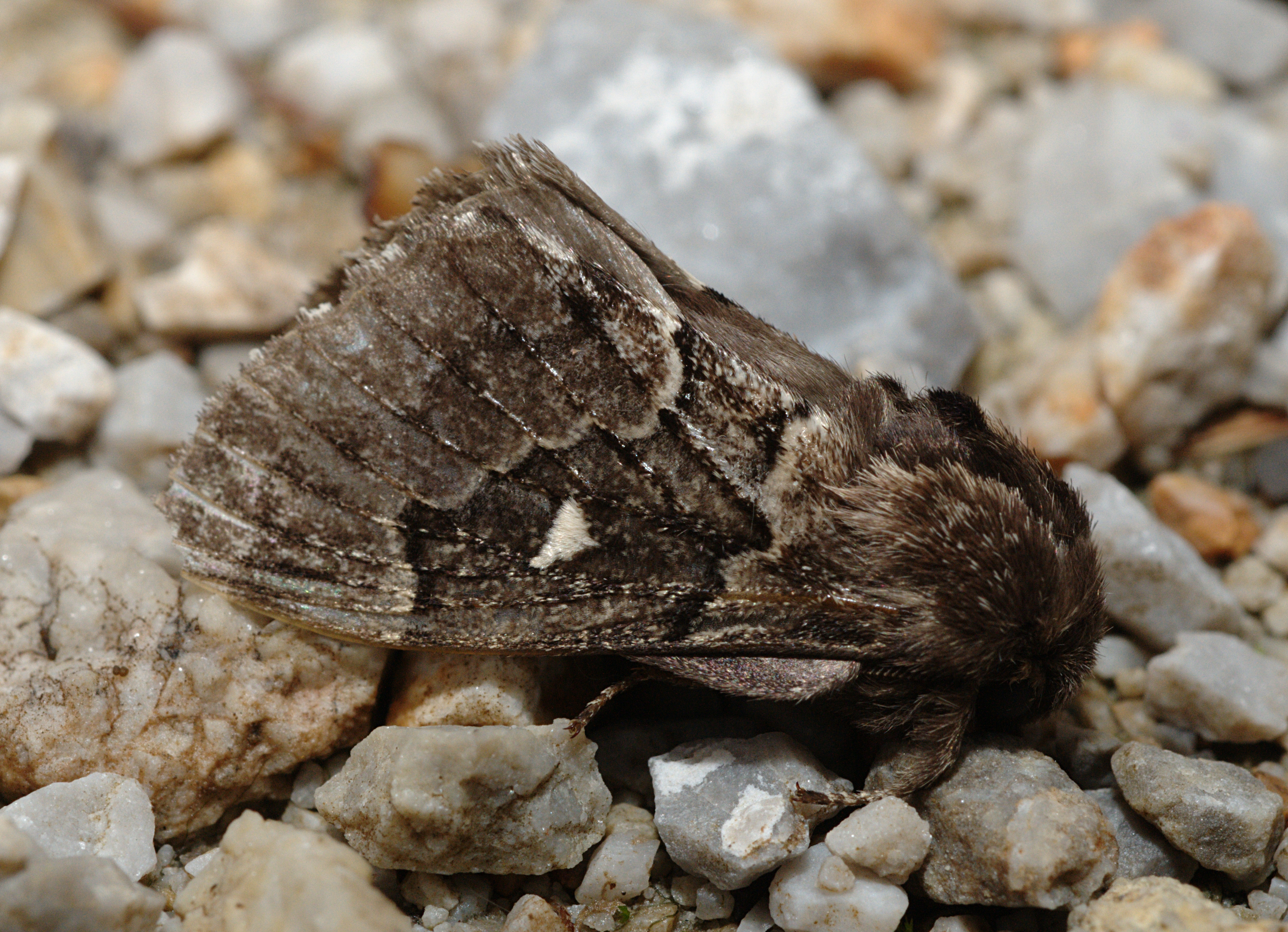

Scientific classification
- Domain: Eukaryota
- Kingdom: Animalia
- Phylum: Arthropoda
- Class: Insecta
- Order: Lepidoptera
- Family: Lasiocampidae
- Genus: Cosmotriche
- Species: C. lobulina

Binomial name
- Cosmotriche lobulina (Denis & Schiffermüller, 1775)

Synonyms
- Bombyx lobulina [Schiffermüller], 1775; Phalaena (Bombyx) lunigera Esper, 1784; Kononia pinivora Matsumura, 1927

= Cosmotriche lobulina =

Species of moth

Cosmotriche lobulina is a moth of the family Lasiocampidae. It is found in Europe through Siberia up to Eastern Asia.

The wingspan is 32–38 mm (1.3–1.5 in) for males and 38-46 (1.5–1.8) for females. The moth flies from May to August in two generations depending on the location.

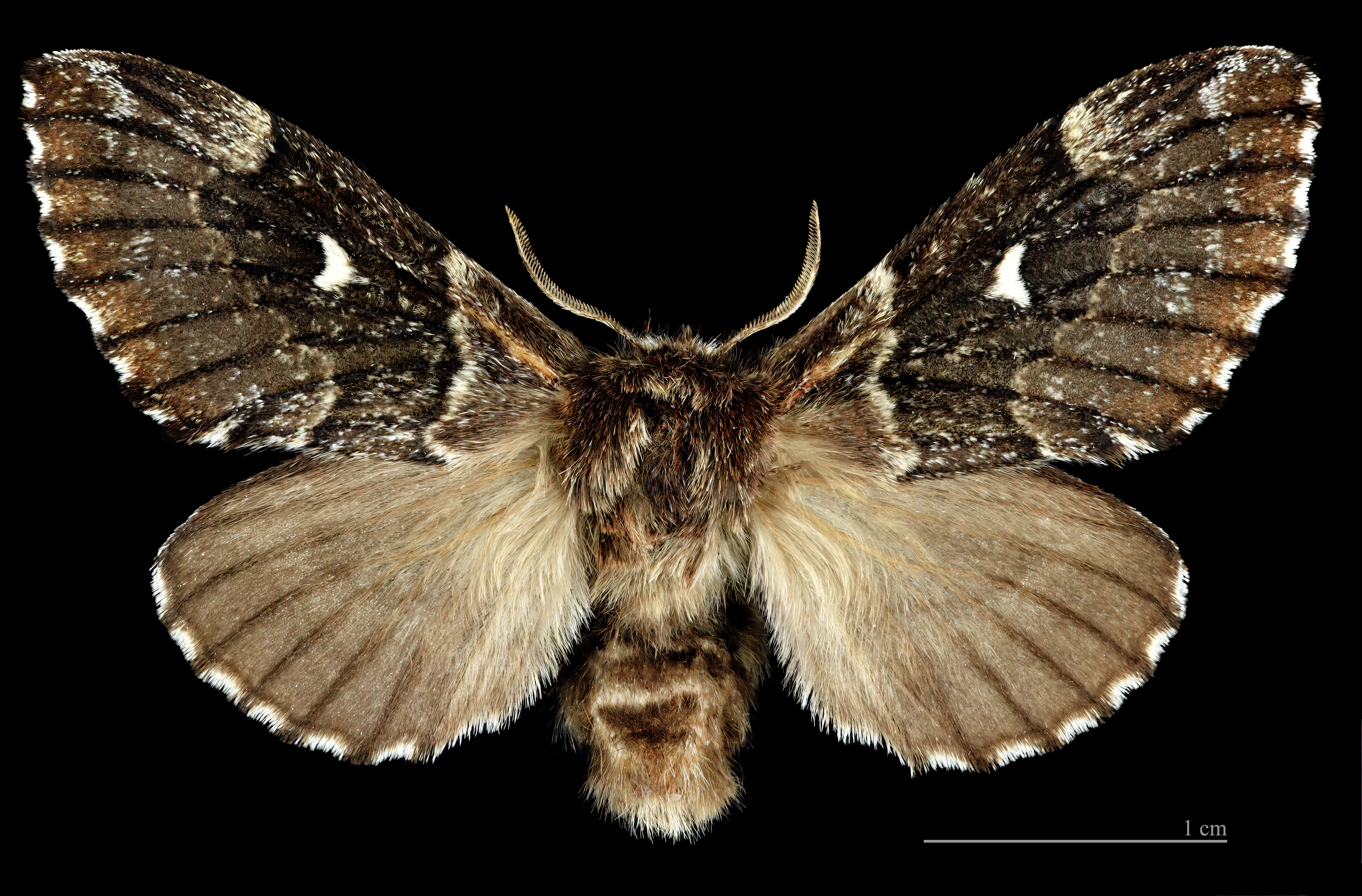
♂

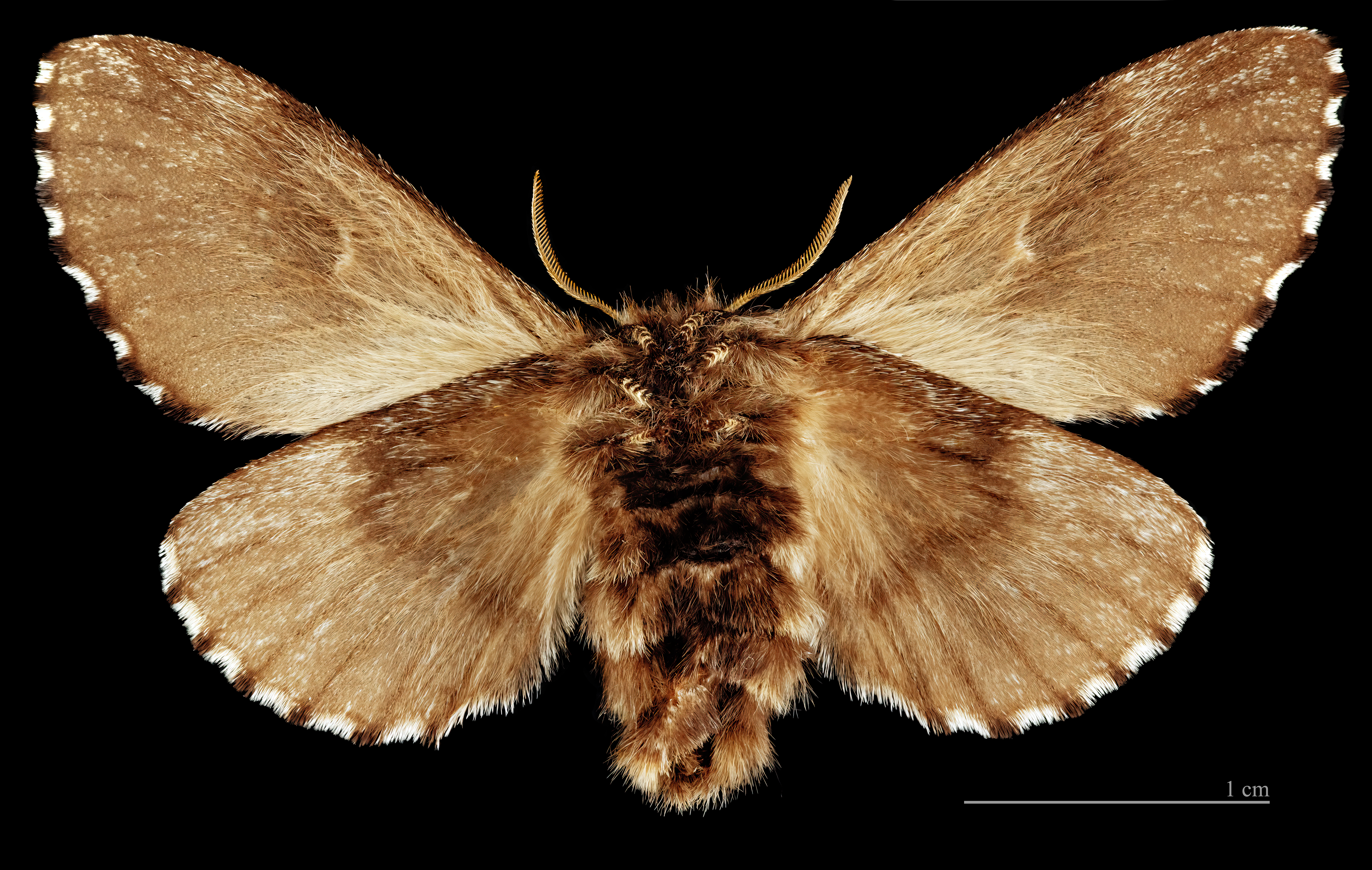
♂ △

The larvae feed on Pinus, Picea, and Abies species.

== Subspecies ==
- Cosmotriche lobulina lobulina
- Cosmotriche lobulina burmanni (Daniel, 1952)
- Cosmotriche lobulina junia Saarenmaa, 1982
- Cosmotriche lobulina pinivora (Matsumura, 1927)
