= Phyllonorycter cytisus =

Scientific classification
- Kingdom: Animalia
- Phylum: Arthropoda
- Clade: Pancrustacea
- Class: Insecta
- Order: Lepidoptera
- Family: Gracillariidae
- Genus: Phyllonorycter
- Species: P. cytisus

Binomial name
- Phyllonorycter cytisus (Amsel & Hartig, 1952)

Synonyms
- Lithocolletis cytisus Amsel & Hartig, 1952

Species of moth

Phyllonorycter cytisus is a moth of the family Gracillariidae. It is known from Sardinia.

The larvae feed on Cytisus villosus. They mine the leaves of their host plant.
