= Eupithecia santolinata =

Scientific classification
- Domain: Eukaryota
- Kingdom: Animalia
- Phylum: Arthropoda
- Class: Insecta
- Order: Lepidoptera
- Family: Geometridae
- Genus: Eupithecia
- Species: E. santolinata

Binomial name
- Eupithecia santolinata Mabille, 1871

Species of moth

Eupithecia santolinata is a moth in the family Geometridae. It is found in France, Spain, Italy and on Sardinia.

The larvae feed on Santolina species.
