= Phyllonorycter retamella =

Scientific classification
- Domain: Eukaryota
- Kingdom: Animalia
- Phylum: Arthropoda
- Class: Insecta
- Order: Lepidoptera
- Family: Gracillariidae
- Genus: Phyllonorycter
- Species: P. retamella

Binomial name
- Phyllonorycter retamella (Chretien, 1915)

Synonyms
- Lithocolletis retamella Chretien, 1915

Species of moth

Phyllonorycter retamella is a moth of the family Gracillariidae. It is known from Sicily and Tunisia.

Adults have been recorded on wing from May to June. There are two or more generations per year.

The larvae feed on Retama raetam. They mine the stem of their host plant.
