= Phyllonorycter belotella =

Scientific classification
- Domain: Eukaryota
- Kingdom: Animalia
- Phylum: Arthropoda
- Class: Insecta
- Order: Lepidoptera
- Family: Gracillariidae
- Genus: Phyllonorycter
- Species: P. belotella

Binomial name
- Phyllonorycter belotella (Staudinger, 1859)

Synonyms
- Lithocolletis belotella Staudinger, 1859; Phyllonorycter anatolica Deschka, 1970; Lithocolletis joviella Constant, 1890

Species of moth

Phyllonorycter belotella is a moth of the family Gracillariidae. It is known from the Mediterranean region from the Iberian Peninsula to Greece.

The larvae feed on Quercus coccifera, Quercus ilex and Quercus suber. They mine the leaves of their host plant.
