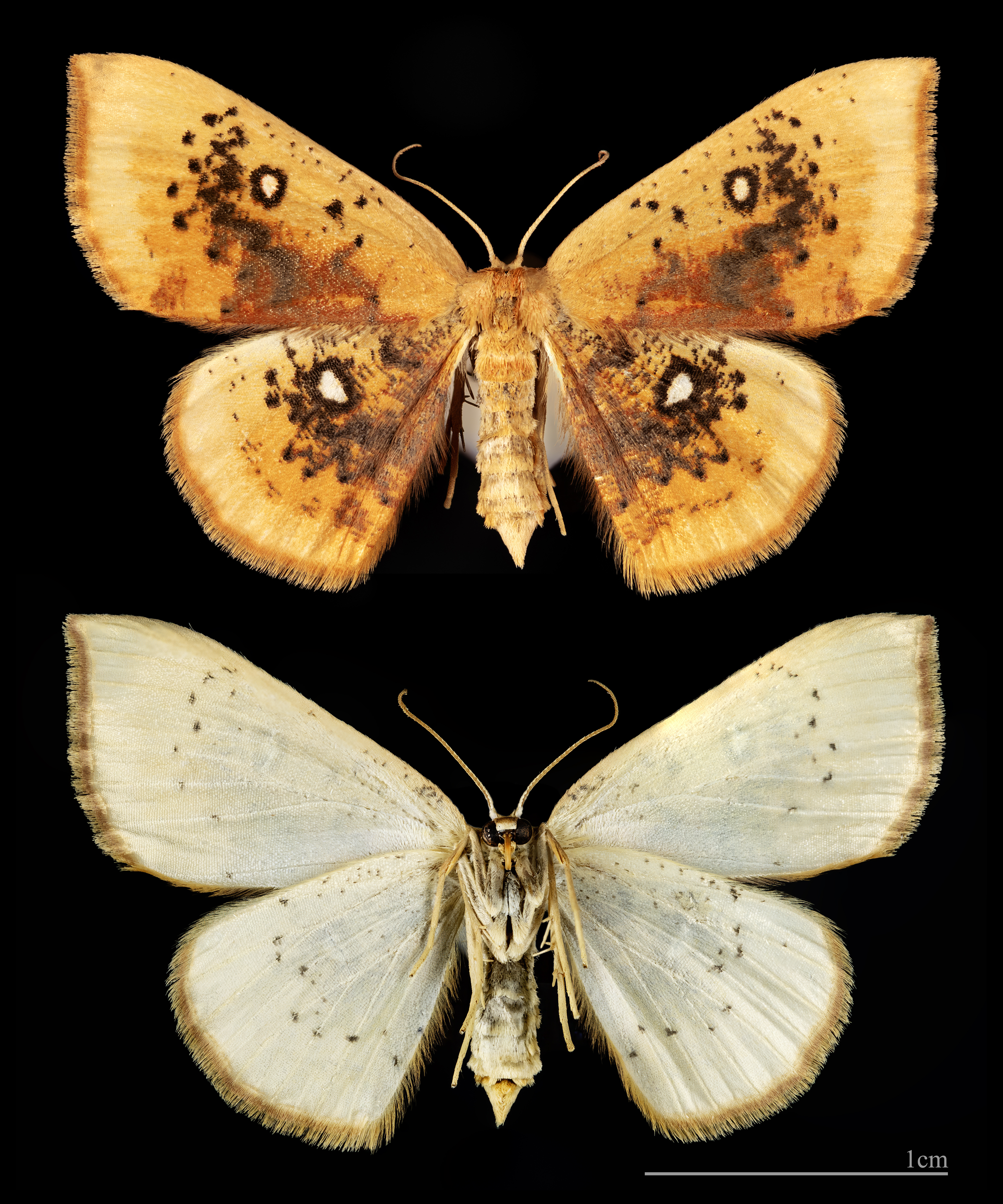
- Cyclophora albiocellaria ♀

Scientific classification
- Kingdom: Animalia
- Phylum: Arthropoda
- Clade: Pancrustacea
- Class: Insecta
- Order: Lepidoptera
- Family: Geometridae
- Genus: Cyclophora
- Species: C. albiocellaria

Binomial name
- Cyclophora albiocellaria (Hübner, 1789)

Synonyms
- Phalaena albiocellaria Hubner, 1789; Geometra ocellaria Hübner, [1799]; Ephyra argusaria Boisduval, 1840; Cyclophora therinata Bastelberger, 1900

= Cyclophora albiocellaria =

Species of moth

Cyclophora albiocellaria is a moth of the family Geometridae. It is found in south-eastern Europe and parts of Central-Asia.

The wingspan is 20–25 mm in the first generation and only about 18 mm in the second generation. The apex of the forewing is slightly pointed. The ground colour is pale yellow with an orange tinge. The postmedial line is dissolved to brown dots. The medial area towards postmedial line and towards the inner area shows a strong black brown coloration on all wings. Cell rings are large and round on all wings with a white centre.

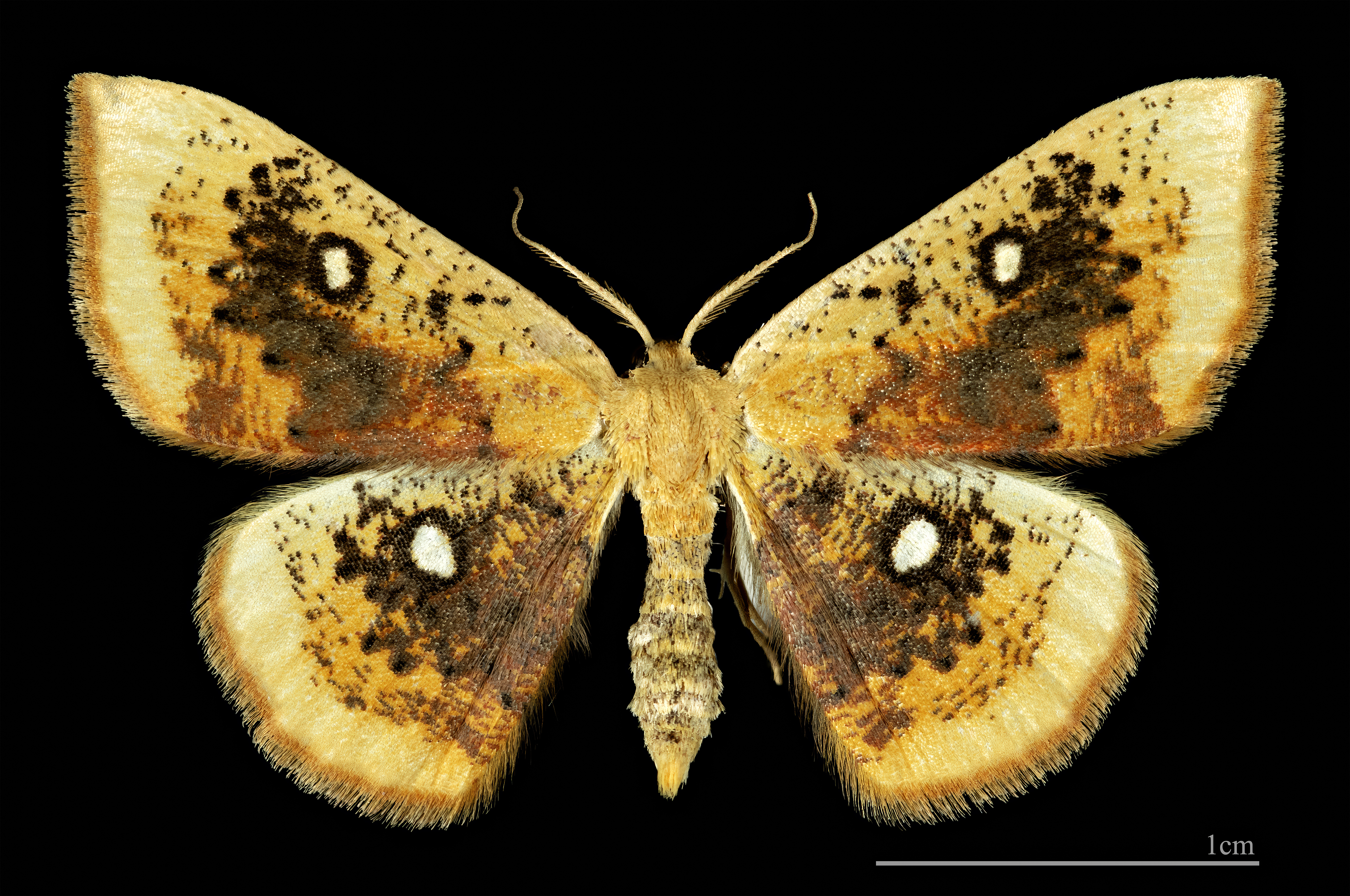
♂

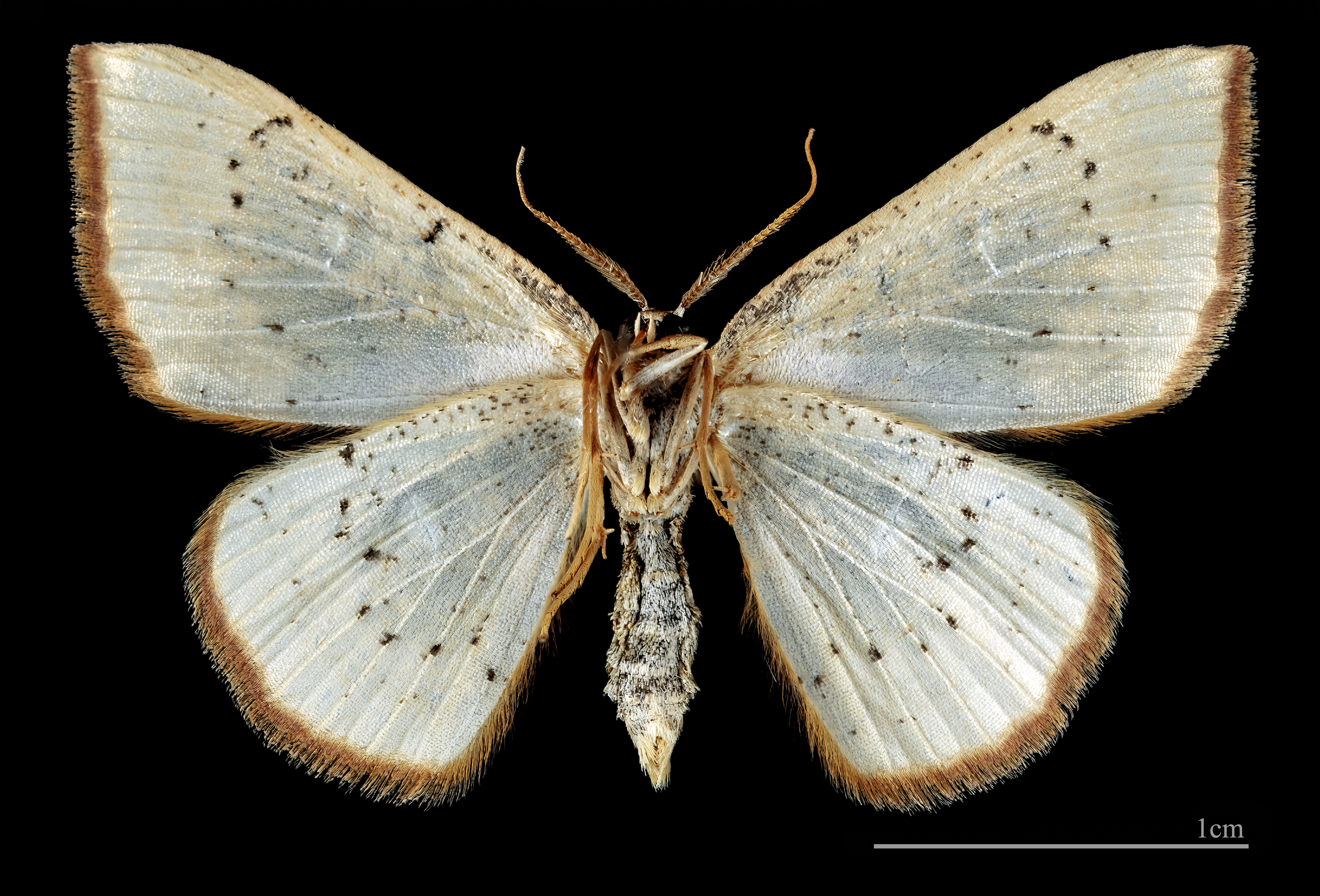
♂ △

The larvae feed on Acer campestre.

== Taxonomy ==
Cyclophora lennigiaria is treated as a subspecies of Cyclophora albiocellaria by some authors.
