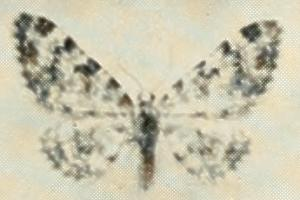

Scientific classification
- Domain: Eukaryota
- Kingdom: Animalia
- Phylum: Arthropoda
- Class: Insecta
- Order: Lepidoptera
- Family: Geometridae
- Genus: Eupithecia
- Species: E. poecilata

Binomial name
- Eupithecia poecilata Püngeler, 1888

Synonyms
- Eupithecia lithographata

= Eupithecia poecilata =

Species of moth

Eupithecia poecilata is a moth in the family Geometridae. It is found on Corsica and Sardinia.

The wingspan is about 16 mm.
