= Eupithecia spadiceata =

Scientific classification
- Domain: Eukaryota
- Kingdom: Animalia
- Phylum: Arthropoda
- Class: Insecta
- Order: Lepidoptera
- Family: Geometridae
- Genus: Eupithecia
- Species: E. spadiceata

Binomial name
- Eupithecia spadiceata Zerny, 1933

Species of moth

Eupithecia spadiceata is a moth in the family Geometridae first described by Hans Zerny in 1933. It is found in the Near East (including Armenia), Italy, Hungary, Ukraine and Russia.
