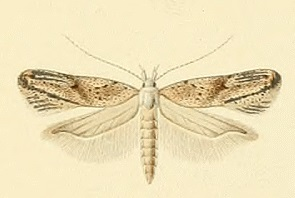

Scientific classification
- Domain: Eukaryota
- Kingdom: Animalia
- Phylum: Arthropoda
- Class: Insecta
- Order: Lepidoptera
- Family: Gelechiidae
- Genus: Scrobipalpa
- Species: S. gallicella

Binomial name
- Scrobipalpa gallicella (Constant, 1885)

Synonyms
- Lita gallicella Constant, 1885; Gnorimoschema gallicella

= Scrobipalpa gallicella =

Species of moth

Scrobipalpa gallicella is a moth in the family Gelechiidae. It was described by Constant in 1885. It is found in Spain, southern France and Italy to Hungary, Ukraine and Russia.

The wingspan is 7–9 mm (0.28–0.35 in).

The larvae feed on Artemisia caerulescens gallica and Artemisia alba.
