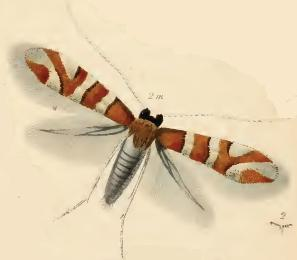

Scientific classification
- Domain: Eukaryota
- Kingdom: Animalia
- Phylum: Arthropoda
- Class: Insecta
- Order: Lepidoptera
- Family: Gracillariidae
- Genus: Phyllonorycter
- Species: P. schreberella

Binomial name
- Phyllonorycter schreberella (Fabricius, 1781)

Synonyms
- Tinea schreberella Fabricius, 1781

= Phyllonorycter schreberella =

Species of moth

Phyllonorycter schreberella is a moth of the family Gracillariidae. It is known from Europe, except northern Europe, Ireland and the Balkan Peninsula.

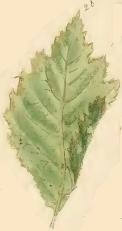
Mined elm leaf

Larva

The wingspan is 6–8 mm. There are two generations per year with adults on wing in May and again in August.

The larvae feed on Ulmus glabra, Ulmus laevis, Ulmus minor and Ulmus pumila. They mine the leaves of their host plant.
