= Scrobipalpa spergulariella =

Scientific classification
- Domain: Eukaryota
- Kingdom: Animalia
- Phylum: Arthropoda
- Class: Insecta
- Order: Lepidoptera
- Family: Gelechiidae
- Genus: Scrobipalpa
- Species: S. spergulariella

Binomial name
- Scrobipalpa spergulariella (Chrétien, 1910)

Synonyms
- Lita spergulariella Chrétien, 1910

Species of moth

Scrobipalpa spergulariella is a moth in the family Gelechiidae. It was described by Pierre Chrétien in 1910. It is found in Tunisia, Spain, southern France, on Sicily, in Greece and on Crete.

The wingspan is 9–10.5 mm (0.35–0.41 in).

The larvae feed on Spergularia azorica and Spergularia media.
