= Dichomeris helianthemi =

Scientific classification
- Domain: Eukaryota
- Kingdom: Animalia
- Phylum: Arthropoda
- Class: Insecta
- Order: Lepidoptera
- Family: Gelechiidae
- Genus: Dichomeris
- Species: D. helianthemi

Binomial name
- Dichomeris helianthemi (Walsingham, 1903)

Synonyms
- Hypsolophus helianthemi Walsingham, 1903

Species of moth

Dichomeris helianthemi is a moth in the family Gelechiidae. It is found in Spain, France and Italy.

The wingspan is about 16.5 mm (0.65 in). The forewings are pale mouse-grey, sprinkled with fuscous scales and with a slight fuscous suffusion along the costa and three ill-defined fuscous spots along the disc, the first near the base and the second before the middle, the third at the end of the cell. The hindwings are pale stone-grey.

The larvae feed on Helianthemum lavandulaefolium.
