= Aristotelia decoratella =

Scientific classification
- Kingdom: Animalia
- Phylum: Arthropoda
- Clade: Pancrustacea
- Class: Insecta
- Order: Lepidoptera
- Family: Gelechiidae
- Genus: Aristotelia
- Species: A. decoratella

Binomial name
- Aristotelia decoratella (Staudinger, 1879)

Synonyms
- Ergatis decoratella Staudinger, 1879

Species of moth

Aristotelia decoratella is a moth of the family Gelechiidae. It is found in Portugal, France, Italy, Switzerland, Germany, Hungary, Slovakia, Bulgaria, Russia, as well as on Sardinia, Corsica and Sicily. It is also present in Asia Minor.
