= Eupithecia lentiscata =

Scientific classification
- Domain: Eukaryota
- Kingdom: Animalia
- Phylum: Arthropoda
- Class: Insecta
- Order: Lepidoptera
- Family: Geometridae
- Genus: Eupithecia
- Species: E. lentiscata

Binomial name
- Eupithecia lentiscata Mabille, 1869

Species of moth

Eupithecia lentiscata is a moth in the family Geometridae. It is found on Sardinia, Corsica and in southern Greece.

The larvae feed on Pistacia lentiscus.
