= Phyllonorycter vulturella =

Scientific classification
- Kingdom: Animalia
- Phylum: Arthropoda
- Class: Insecta
- Order: Lepidoptera
- Family: Gracillariidae
- Genus: Phyllonorycter
- Species: P. vulturella

Binomial name
- Phyllonorycter vulturella (Deschka, 1968)

Synonyms
- Lithocolletis vulturella Deschka, 1968

Species of moth

Phyllonorycter vulturella is a moth of the family Gracillariidae. It is found in southern Italy and France.

The larvae feed on Alnus glutinosa. They mine the leaves of their host plant.
