= Scrobipalpa montanella =

Scientific classification
- Domain: Eukaryota
- Kingdom: Animalia
- Phylum: Arthropoda
- Class: Insecta
- Order: Lepidoptera
- Family: Gelechiidae
- Genus: Scrobipalpa
- Species: S. montanella

Binomial name
- Scrobipalpa montanella (Chrétien, 1910)

Synonyms
- Lita montanella Chrétien, 1910

Species of moth

Scrobipalpa montanella is a moth in the family Gelechiidae. It was described by Pierre Chrétien in 1910. It is found in southern France and Sicily.

The wingspan is 9.5–10 mm (0.37–0.39 in).

The larvae feed on Anthemis cretica. They mine the leaves, but also live freely, feeding on the stem and leaves. The larvae are pale green, with reddish transverse bands and a pale brown head.
