= Phyllonorycter baldensis =

Scientific classification
- Kingdom: Animalia
- Phylum: Arthropoda
- Clade: Pancrustacea
- Class: Insecta
- Order: Lepidoptera
- Family: Gracillariidae
- Genus: Phyllonorycter
- Species: P. baldensis

Binomial name
- Phyllonorycter baldensis Deschka, 1986

Species of moth

Phyllonorycter baldensis is a moth of the family Gracillariidae. It is found in northern Italy.
