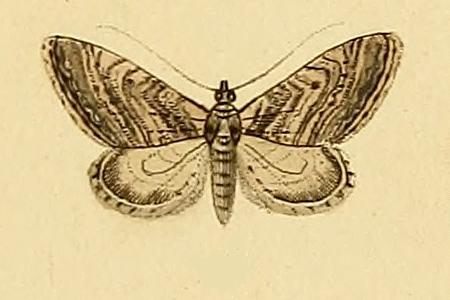

Scientific classification
- Kingdom: Animalia
- Phylum: Arthropoda
- Class: Insecta
- Order: Lepidoptera
- Family: Geometridae
- Genus: Eupithecia
- Species: E. scopariata

Binomial name
- Eupithecia scopariata (Rambur, 1833)

Synonyms
- Larentia scopariata Rambur, 1833; Eupithecia multiflorata Milliere, 1866; Eupithecia scoparia Boisduval, 1840; Eupithecia tenebrosaria Herrich-Schaffer, 1848; Eupithecia graslinaria Staudinger, 1871

= Eupithecia scopariata =

Species of moth

Eupithecia scopariata is a moth in the family Geometridae. It is found in southern Europe (Portugal, Spain, France (including Corsica), Italy (including Sardinia), Croatia, Greece) and in Austria (rare in Tyrol).

The wingspan is about 17 mm. The larvae feed on Erica scoparia.

== Subspecies ==
There are at least two subspecies:

- Eupithecia scopariata scopariata (Rambur, 1833)
- Eupithecia scopariata guinardaria Boisduval, 1840
