= Scrobipalpa thymelaeae =

Scientific classification
- Domain: Eukaryota
- Kingdom: Animalia
- Phylum: Arthropoda
- Class: Insecta
- Order: Lepidoptera
- Family: Gelechiidae
- Genus: Scrobipalpa
- Species: S. thymelaeae

Binomial name
- Scrobipalpa thymelaeae (Amsel, 1939)

Synonyms
- Lita thymelaeae Amsel, 1939

Species of moth

Scrobipalpa thymelaeae is a moth in the family Gelechiidae. It was described by Hans Georg Amsel in 1939 and is found on Sardinia and in Bulgaria.

The larvae feed on Thymelaea hirsuta.
