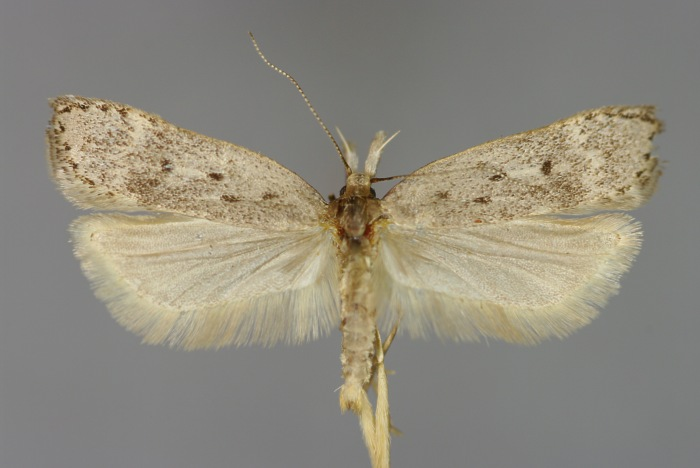

Scientific classification
- Kingdom: Animalia
- Phylum: Arthropoda
- Class: Insecta
- Order: Lepidoptera
- Family: Gelechiidae
- Genus: Dichomeris
- Species: D. juniperella

Binomial name
- Dichomeris juniperella (Linnaeus, 1761)

Synonyms
- Phalaena juniperella Linnaeus, 1761

= Dichomeris juniperella =

Scotch crest

Species of moth

Dichomeris juniperella, the Scotch crest, is a moth of the family Gelechiidae. It is found in almost all of Europe, except Ireland, the Benelux and the western and southern part of the Balkan Peninsula. The habitat consists of montane areas, including open woodland, mountainsides and gullies.

The wingspan is 18–22 mm. Adults are on wing from June to August in one generation per year.

The larvae feed on the needles of Juniperus communis from under a silken spinning. They can be found from April to July.
