= Phyllonorycter etnensis =

Scientific classification
- Domain: Eukaryota
- Kingdom: Animalia
- Phylum: Arthropoda
- Class: Insecta
- Order: Lepidoptera
- Family: Gracillariidae
- Genus: Phyllonorycter
- Species: P. etnensis

Binomial name
- Phyllonorycter etnensis A. & Z. Lastuvka, 2006

Species of moth

Phyllonorycter etnensis is a moth of the family Gracillariidae. It is known from Sicily. They mine the leaves of their host plants of Genista aetnensis or bore the stems.
