= Scrobipalpa monochromella =

Scientific classification
- Kingdom: Animalia
- Phylum: Arthropoda
- Clade: Pancrustacea
- Class: Insecta
- Order: Lepidoptera
- Family: Gelechiidae
- Genus: Scrobipalpa
- Species: S. monochromella

Binomial name
- Scrobipalpa monochromella (Constant, 1895)

Synonyms
- Gelechia monochromella Constant, 1895

Species of moth

Scrobipalpa monochromella is a moth in the family Gelechiidae. It was described by Constant in 1895. It is found in southern France, Italy, Corsica, Sicily and Ukraine.

The wingspan is 13–16 mm (0.51–0.63 in).

The larvae feed on Limonium vulgare. They live between spun leaves or as a leaf miner.
