= Scrobipalpa bradleyi =

Scientific classification
- Kingdom: Animalia
- Phylum: Arthropoda
- Clade: Pancrustacea
- Class: Insecta
- Order: Lepidoptera
- Family: Gelechiidae
- Genus: Scrobipalpa
- Species: S. bradleyi

Binomial name
- Scrobipalpa bradleyi Povolný, 1971

Synonyms
- Scrobipalpa glaserorum Povolný, 1977

Species of moth

Scrobipalpa bradleyi is a moth in the family Gelechiidae. It was described by Dalibor Povolný in 1971. It is found in North Africa (Algeria, Tunisia) and Southern Europe (southern Spain, Sicily, and southern France).

The length of the forewings is 4.8–5.2 mm (0.19–0.20 in) for females and 5.8–6.2 mm (0.23–0.24 in) for males. The larvae feed on Salicornia fruticosa (Amaranthaceae).
