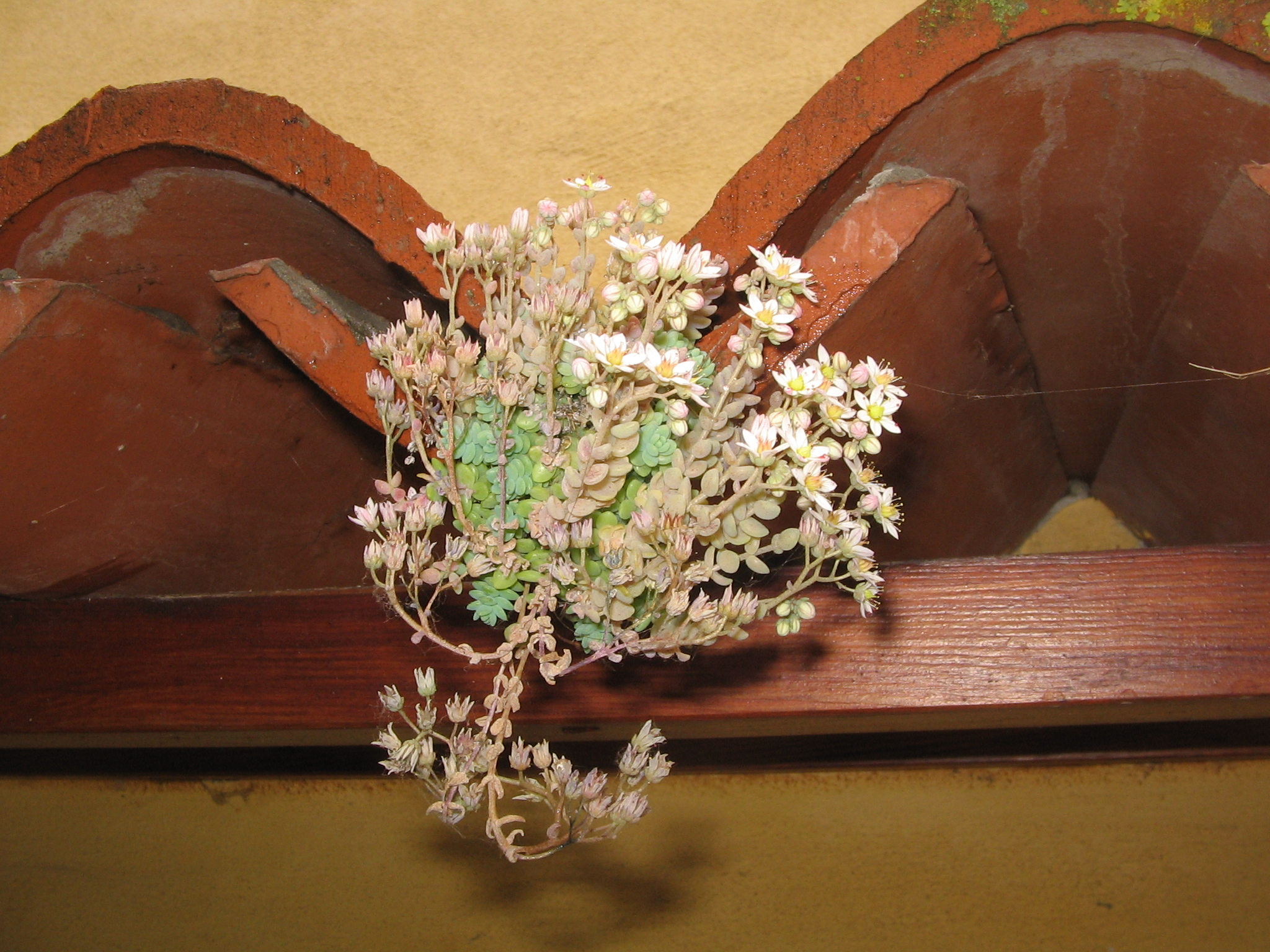
- A Sedum dasyphyllum with flowers at a rural house in Southern Italy

Scientific classification
- Kingdom: Plantae
- Clade: Tracheophytes
- Clade: Angiosperms
- Clade: Eudicots
- Order: Saxifragales
- Family: Crassulaceae
- Genus: Sedum
- Species: S. dasyphyllum

Binomial name
- Sedum dasyphyllum L.

Synonyms
- Sedum burnatii

= Sedum dasyphyllum =

Species of succulent

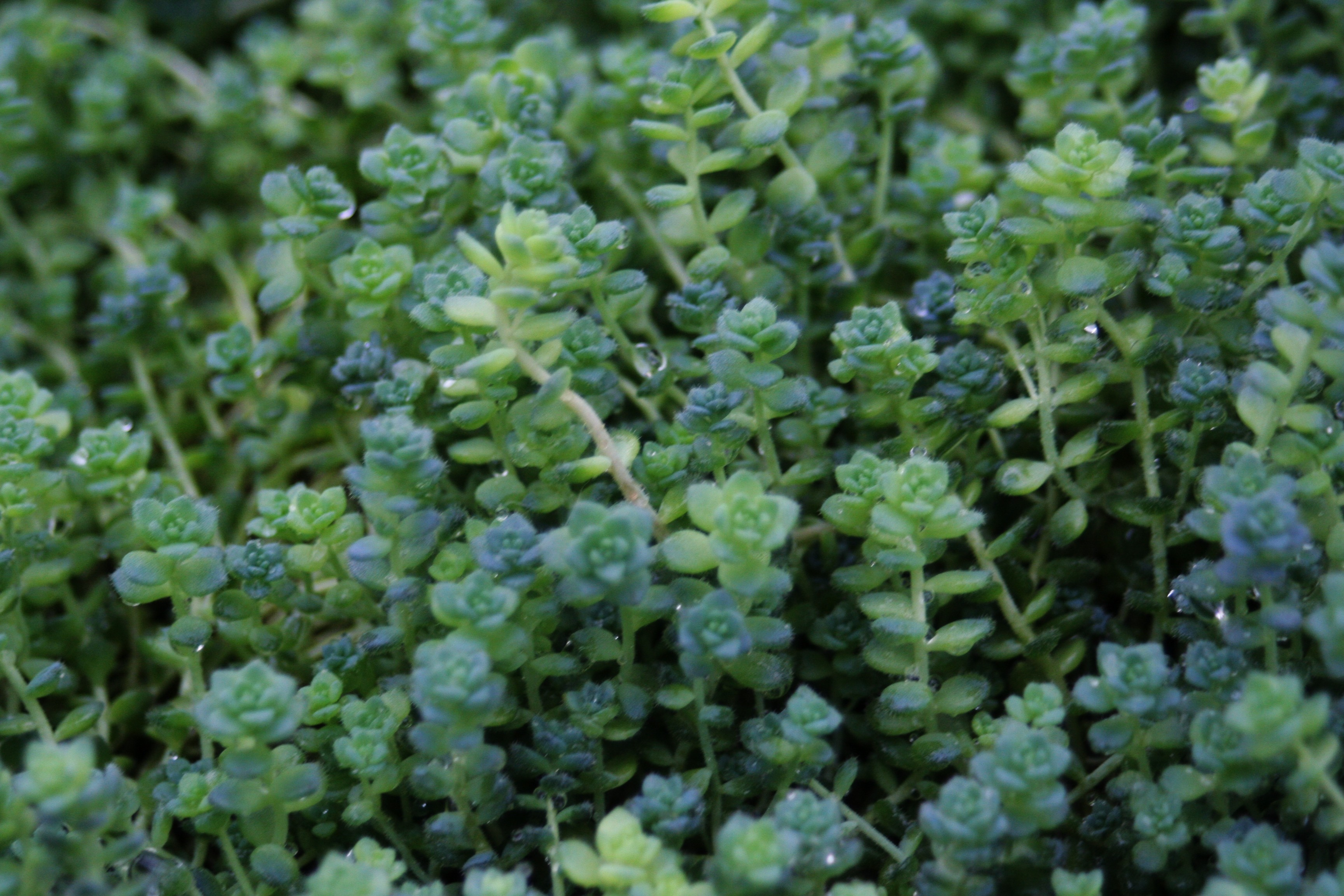
Detail of stems

Sedum dasyphyllum, also named Sedum burnatii and commonly known as Corsican stonecrop or thick-leaved stonecrop, is a low-growing succulent flowering plant of the genus Sedum in the family Crassulaceae.

== Description ==
It is a small perennial plant with green-turquoise or gray-green opposite leaves and a creeping stem forming shrubs. Its flowers are white and small with little black dots on the petals and green ovaries. The Sedum dasyphyllum, typical of the Mediterranean region, usually grows among the rocks, especially among the tuff walls of rural areas.

== Gallery ==
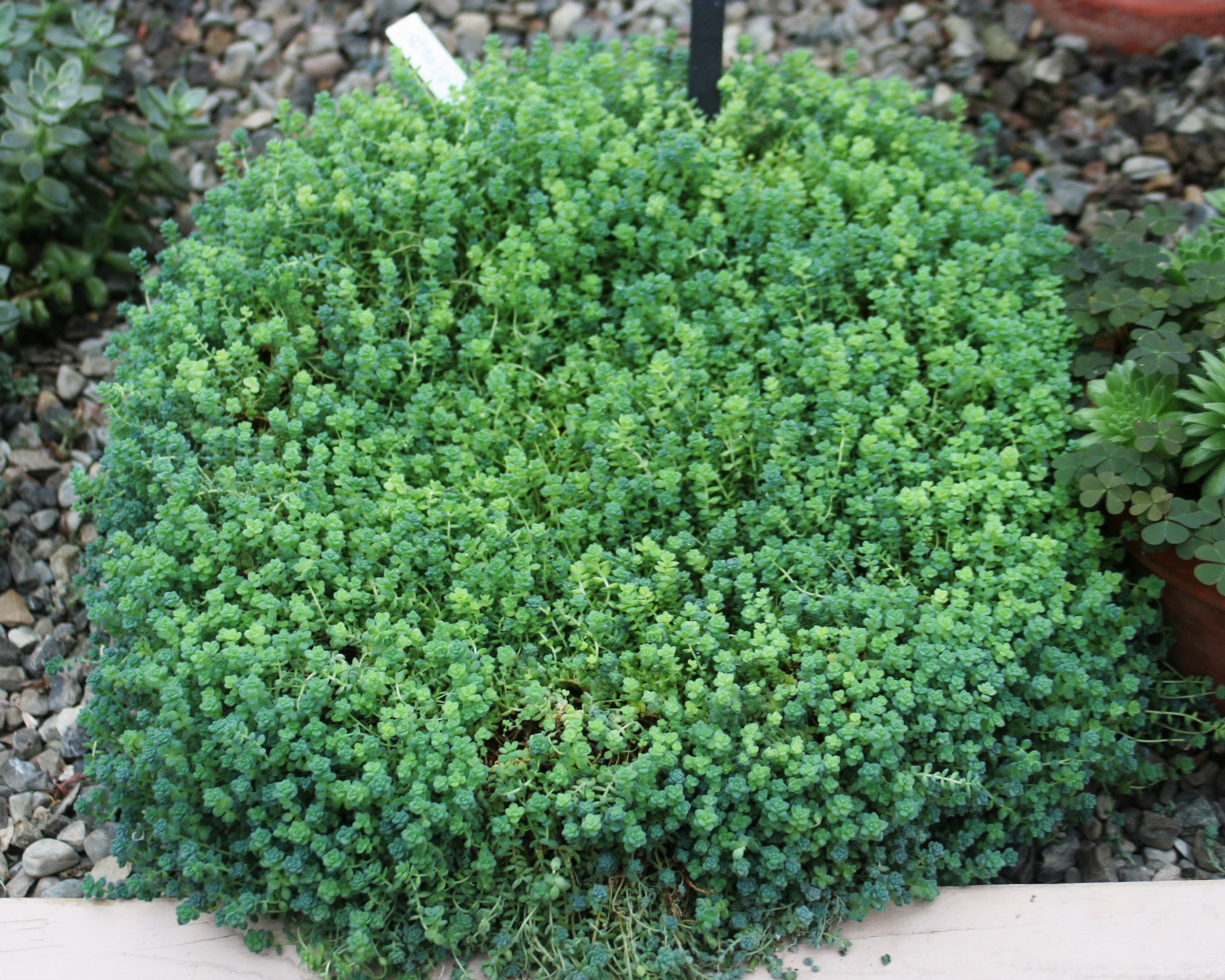
A shrub at Buffalo Botanical Garden

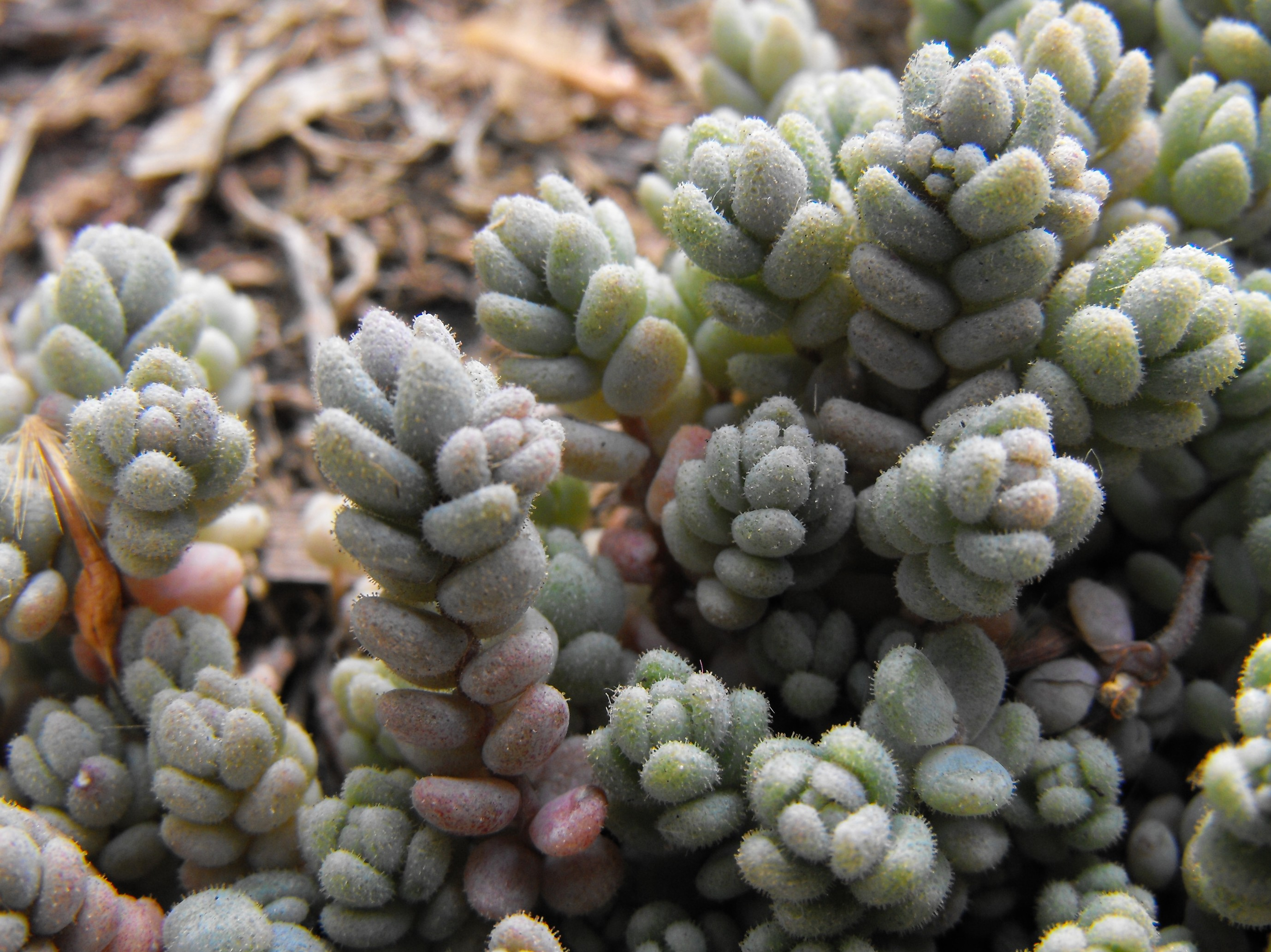
Detail of leaves

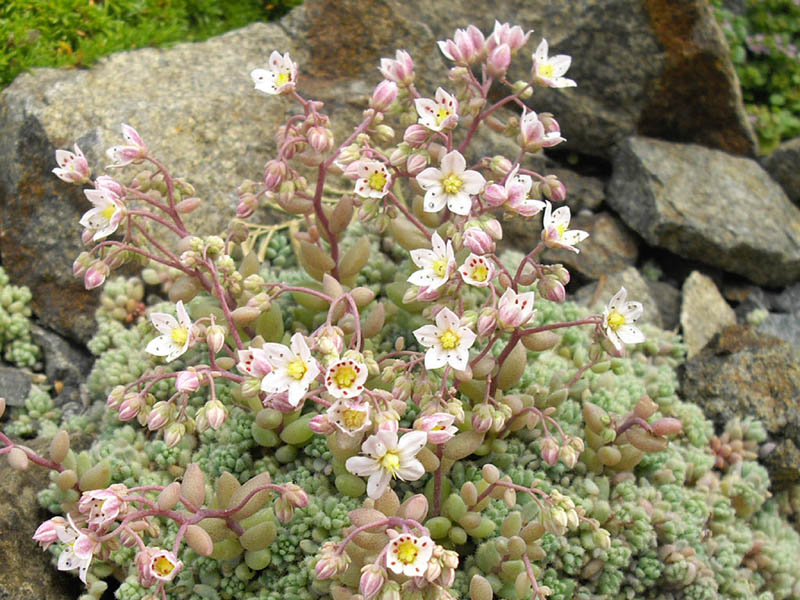
Flowers

== Subspecies and varieties ==
- Sedum dasyphyllum subsp. dasyphyllum
- Sedum dasyphyllum subsp. glanduliferum
- Sedum dasyphyllum subsp. granatense
- Sedum dasyphyllum var. microphyllum
