= Phyllonorycter anceps =

Scientific classification
- Kingdom: Animalia
- Phylum: Arthropoda
- Clade: Pancrustacea
- Class: Insecta
- Order: Lepidoptera
- Family: Gracillariidae
- Genus: Phyllonorycter
- Species: P. anceps

Binomial name
- Phyllonorycter anceps Triberti, 2007

Species of moth

Phyllonorycter anceps is a moth of the family Gracillariidae. It is found in Sardinia, Italy and Crete.

The larvae feed on Malus, Mespilus, Prunus dulcis and Pyrus communis. They mine the leaves of their host plant.
