= Phyllonorycter endryella =

Scientific classification
- Domain: Eukaryota
- Kingdom: Animalia
- Phylum: Arthropoda
- Class: Insecta
- Order: Lepidoptera
- Family: Gracillariidae
- Genus: Phyllonorycter
- Species: P. endryella

Binomial name
- Phyllonorycter endryella (Mann, 1855)

Synonyms
- Lithocolletis endryella Mann, 1855

Species of moth

Phyllonorycter endryella is a moth of the family Gracillariidae. It is known from the Iberian Peninsula, southern France, Corsica, Sardinia and Maghreb.

The larvae feed on Quercus coccifera, Quercus ilex and Quercus suber. They mine the leaves of their host plant.
