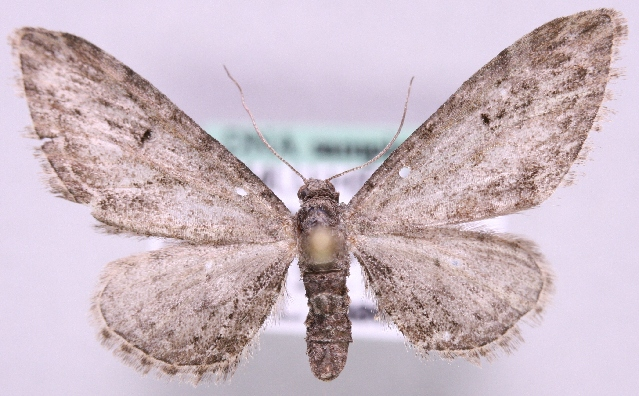

Scientific classification
- Domain: Eukaryota
- Kingdom: Animalia
- Phylum: Arthropoda
- Class: Insecta
- Order: Lepidoptera
- Family: Geometridae
- Genus: Eupithecia
- Species: E. ochridata

Binomial name
- Eupithecia ochridata Schutze & Pinker, 1968

Synonyms
- Eupithecia szelenyii Vojnits, 1969

= Eupithecia ochridata =

Species of moth

Eupithecia ochridata is a moth in the family Geometridae. It is found in most of Europe, except Ireland, Great Britain, the Benelux, France, Portugal, Austria, Croatia, and northern Russia. It is also present in the eastern Palearctic realm and the Near East.

The wingspan is about 18–20 mm.

The larvae feed on Artemisia campestris.
