= Eupithecia sardoa =

Scientific classification
- Domain: Eukaryota
- Kingdom: Animalia
- Phylum: Arthropoda
- Class: Insecta
- Order: Lepidoptera
- Family: Geometridae
- Genus: Eupithecia
- Species: E. sardoa

Binomial name
- Eupithecia sardoa Dietze, 1910

Synonyms
- Eupithecia peterseni Wagner, 1914

Species of moth

Eupithecia sardoa is a moth in the family Geometridae. It is found in North Africa and on Corsica, Sardinia, and Mallorca. It was recently recorded from the Parco Naturale della Maremma in Italy.
