= Phyllonorycter phyllocytisi =

Scientific classification
- Domain: Eukaryota
- Kingdom: Animalia
- Phylum: Arthropoda
- Class: Insecta
- Order: Lepidoptera
- Family: Gracillariidae
- Genus: Phyllonorycter
- Species: P. phyllocytisi

Binomial name
- Phyllonorycter phyllocytisi (M. Hering, 1936)

Synonyms
- Lithocolletis phyllocytisi M. Hering, 1936

Species of moth

Phyllonorycter phyllocytisi is a moth of the family Gracillariidae. It is known to be from France, Spain and Italy.

The larvae feed on Cytisus sessilifolius. They mine the leaves of their host plant.
