= Phyllonorycter millierella =

Scientific classification
- Domain: Eukaryota
- Kingdom: Animalia
- Phylum: Arthropoda
- Class: Insecta
- Order: Lepidoptera
- Family: Gracillariidae
- Genus: Phyllonorycter
- Species: P. millierella

Binomial name
- Phyllonorycter millierella (Staudinger, 1871)

Synonyms
- Lithocolletis millierella Staudinger, 1871; Coccidiphila charlierella Real, 1988

Species of moth

Phyllonorycter millierella is a moth of the family Gracillariidae. It is found in southern Europe, including Spain, France, Switzerland, Italy, Croatia, Bulgaria, North Macedonia and Greece.

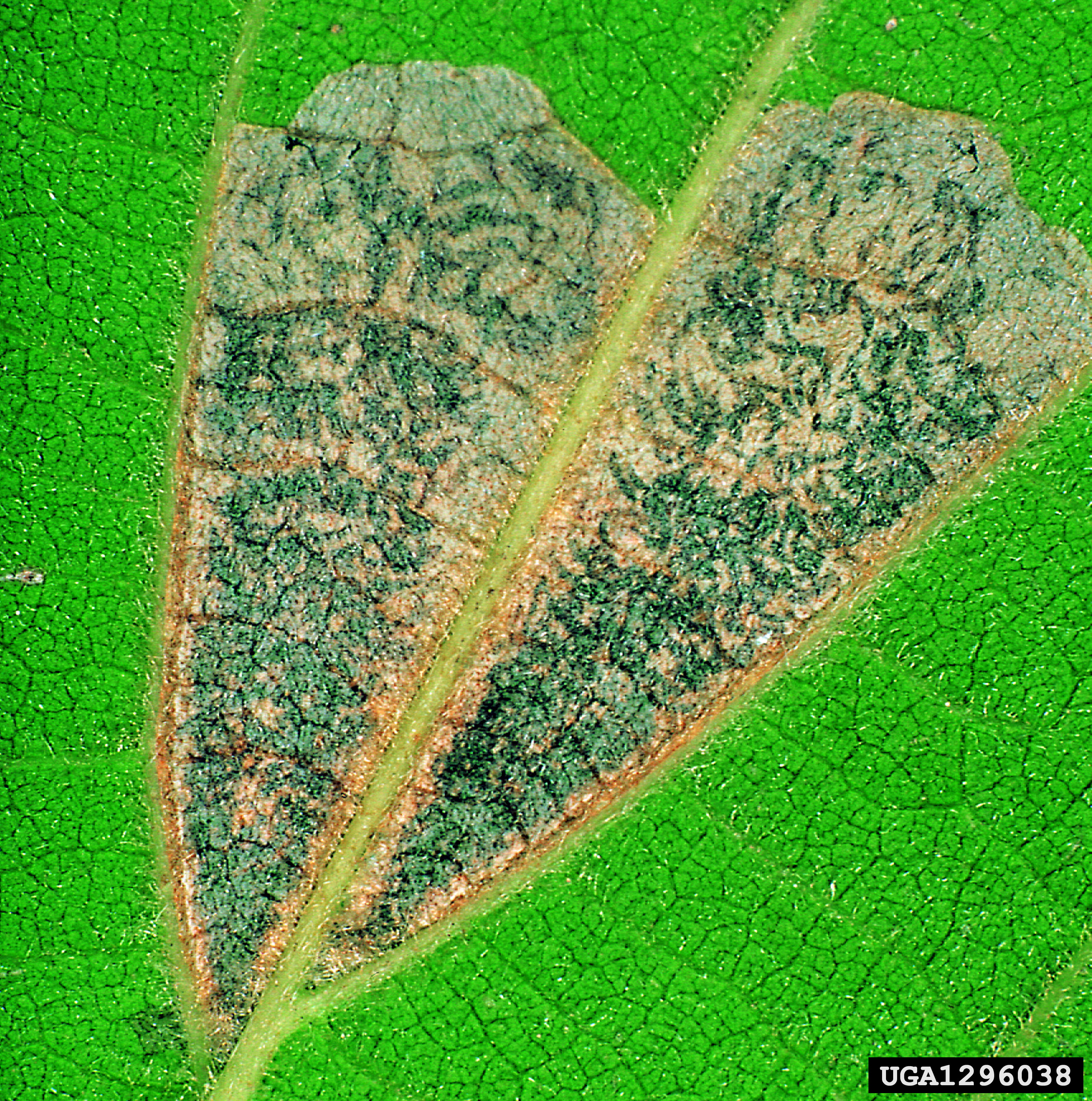
Damage

The larvae feed on Celtis australis. They mine the leaves of their host plant.
