= Scrobipalpa superstes =

Scientific classification
- Kingdom: Animalia
- Phylum: Arthropoda
- Clade: Pancrustacea
- Class: Insecta
- Order: Lepidoptera
- Family: Gelechiidae
- Genus: Scrobipalpa
- Species: S. superstes

Binomial name
- Scrobipalpa superstes Povolný, 1977

Species of moth

Scrobipalpa superstes is a moth in the family Gelechiidae. It was described by Povolný in 1977. It is found in southern Spain, Portugal, southern France and on Sardinia and Sicily.

The length of the forewings is 4 mm (0.16 in) for females and 5 mm (0.20 in) for males.
