= Phyllonorycter kusdasi =

Scientific classification
- Kingdom: Animalia
- Phylum: Arthropoda
- Class: Insecta
- Order: Lepidoptera
- Family: Gracillariidae
- Genus: Phyllonorycter
- Species: P. kusdasi

Binomial name
- Phyllonorycter kusdasi Deschka, 1970

Species of moth

Phyllonorycter kusdasi is a moth of the family Gracillariidae. It is found in the Mediterranean region from Spain to Turkey.

There are several generations per year.

The larvae feed on Quercus pubescens. They mine the leaves of their host plant.
