= Dichomeris nitiellus =

Scientific classification
- Domain: Eukaryota
- Kingdom: Animalia
- Phylum: Arthropoda
- Class: Insecta
- Order: Lepidoptera
- Family: Gelechiidae
- Genus: Dichomeris
- Species: D. nitiellus

Binomial name
- Dichomeris nitiellus (Constantini, 1922)

Synonyms
- Hypsolophus nitiellus Constantini, 1922

Species of moth

Dichomeris nitiellus is a moth in the family Gelechiidae. It is found in Italy and Switzerland.
