= Glyphipterix argyroguttella =

Scientific classification
- Kingdom: Animalia
- Phylum: Arthropoda
- Clade: Pancrustacea
- Class: Insecta
- Order: Lepidoptera
- Family: Glyphipterigidae
- Genus: Glyphipterix
- Species: G. argyroguttella

Binomial name
- Glyphipterix argyroguttella Ragonot, 1885

Synonyms
- Glyphipteryx argyroguttella ab. paurographella Ragonot, 1885; Glyphipterix argyroguttella ab. pauperella Diakonoff, 1984

Species of moth

Glyphipterix argyroguttella is a moth of the family Glyphipterigidae. It is found in France, Italy and Russia.

The wingspan is about 18 mm.

== Subspecies ==
- Glyphipterix argyroguttella argyroguttella
- Glyphipterix argyroguttella paurographella Ragonot, 1885 (Italy)
