= Phyllonorycter suberifoliella =

Scientific classification
- Kingdom: Animalia
- Phylum: Arthropoda
- Clade: Pancrustacea
- Class: Insecta
- Order: Lepidoptera
- Family: Gracillariidae
- Genus: Phyllonorycter
- Species: P. suberifoliella

Binomial name
- Phyllonorycter suberifoliella (Zeller, 1850)

Synonyms
- Lithocolletis suberifoliella Zeller, 1850

Species of moth

Phyllonorycter suberifoliella is a moth of the family Gracillariidae. It is found from southern France and the Iberian Peninsula to Greece.

There are at least two generations per year.

The larvae feed on Quercus ilex and Quercus suber. They mine the leaves of their host plant.
