= Scopula alba =

Scientific classification
- Domain: Eukaryota
- Kingdom: Animalia
- Phylum: Arthropoda
- Class: Insecta
- Order: Lepidoptera
- Family: Geometridae
- Genus: Scopula
- Species: S. alba

Binomial name
- Scopula alba (Hausmann, 1993)

Synonyms
- Glossotrophia alba Hausmann, 1993; Glossotrophia capriata Hausmann, 1993; Glossotrophia dannehli Prout, 1934; Acidalia romanaria Dannehl, 1933; Glossotrophia zahmi Hausmann, 1993; Glossotrophia milleri Hausmann, 2004

Species of geometer moth in subfamily Sterrhinae

Scopula alba is a moth of the family Geometridae. It is found in France, Italy and on Sicily and Corsica.

== Subspecies ==
- Scopula alba alba
- Scopula alba africana (Hausmann, 1993)
- Scopula alba brunellii (Hausmann, 1993)
- Scopula alba capriata (Hausmann, 1993)
- Scopula alba milleri Hausmann, 2004 (Corsica)
