= List of moths of Australia (Lyonetiidae) =

Partial list of Australian moths

This is a list of the Australian moth species of the family Lyonetiidae. It also acts as an index to the species articles and forms part of the full List of moths of Australia.

== Bedelliinae ==
- Bedellia somnulentella (Zeller, 1847)
- Bedellia yasumatsui Kuroko, 1972

== Cemiostominae ==
- Crobylophora chrysidiella Meyrick, 1880
- Crobylophora daricella Meyrick, 1880
- Crobylophora psammosticta Turner, 1923
- Leucoptera acromelas (Turner, 1923)
- Leucoptera arethusa Meyrick, 1915
- Leucoptera argodes Turner, 1923
- Leucoptera argyroptera Turner, 1923
- Leucoptera asbolopasta Turner, 1923
- Leucoptera chalcopleura Turner, 1923
- Leucoptera chalocycla (Meyrick, 1882)
- Leucoptera deltidias Meyrick, 1906
- Leucoptera diasticha Turner, 1923
- Leucoptera euryphaea Turner, 1926
- Leucoptera hemizona Meyrick, 1906
- Leucoptera iolitha Turner, 1923
- Leucoptera melanolitha Turner, 1923
- Leucoptera periphracta Meyrick, 1915
- Leucoptera phaeopasta (Turner, 1923)
- Leucoptera plagiomitra Turner, 1923
- Leucoptera sortita Meyrick, 1915
- Leucoptera spartifoliella (Hübner, 1813)
- Leucoptera strophidota Turner, 1923
- Leucoptera toxeres Turner, 1923
- Nematobola candescens Meyrick, 1893

== Lyonetiinae ==
- Arctocoma ursinella Meyrick, 1880
- Atalopsycha atyphella Meyrick, 1880
- Cateristis centrospila (Turner, 1923)
- Cateristis triradiata Turner, 1926
- Dascia sagittifera Meyrick, 1893
- Diplothectis chionochalca Meyrick, 1893
- Hierocrobyla lophocera Turner, 1923
- Hierocrobyla sporodectis Meyrick, 1915
- Leioprora ascepta Turner, 1900
- Lyonetia embolotypa Turner, 1923
- Lyonetia lechrioscia Turner, 1926
- Lyonetia penthesilea Meyrick, 1921
- Lyonetia photina Turner, 1923
- Lyonetia scriptifera Meyrick, 1921
- Stegommata hesperias Meyrick, 1893
- Stegommata leptomitella Meyrick, 1880
- Stegommata sulfuratella Meyrick, 1880
