= Phyllobrostis eremitella =

Scientific classification
- Domain: Eukaryota
- Kingdom: Animalia
- Phylum: Arthropoda
- Class: Insecta
- Order: Lepidoptera
- Family: Lyonetiidae
- Genus: Phyllobrostis
- Species: P. eremitella

Binomial name
- Phyllobrostis eremitella de Joannis, 1912

Synonyms
- Lyonetia eremitella (de Joannis, 1912)

Species of moth

Phyllobrostis eremitella is a moth in the family Lyonetiidae. It is found in Portugal, France (Alpes-Maritimes, Bouches-du-Rhone, Pyrenees-Orientales, Var), and Italy.

The wingspan is 9–9.5 mm (0.35–0.37 in) for males and 9.5–10.5 mm (0.37–0.41 in) for females. The larvae feed on Daphne gnidium, forming galls.
