= Phyllobrostis daphneella =

Scientific classification
- Domain: Eukaryota
- Kingdom: Animalia
- Phylum: Arthropoda
- Class: Insecta
- Order: Lepidoptera
- Family: Lyonetiidae
- Genus: Phyllobrostis
- Species: P. daphneella

Binomial name
- Phyllobrostis daphneella Staudinger, 1859

Synonyms
- Lyonetia daphneella (Staudinger, 1859)

Species of moth

Phyllobrostis daphneella is a moth in the family Lyonetiidae. It is found in North Africa (Morocco, Algeria, Tunisia) in Southern Europe (Portugal, Spain, southern France, Corsica, Sardinia, mainland Italy).

The wingspan is 8.8–9.5 mm for males and 9.5–10 mm for females. In France, adults are on wing from April to May and again in August in two generations. The larvae feed on Daphne gnidium. They mine the leaves of their host plant.
