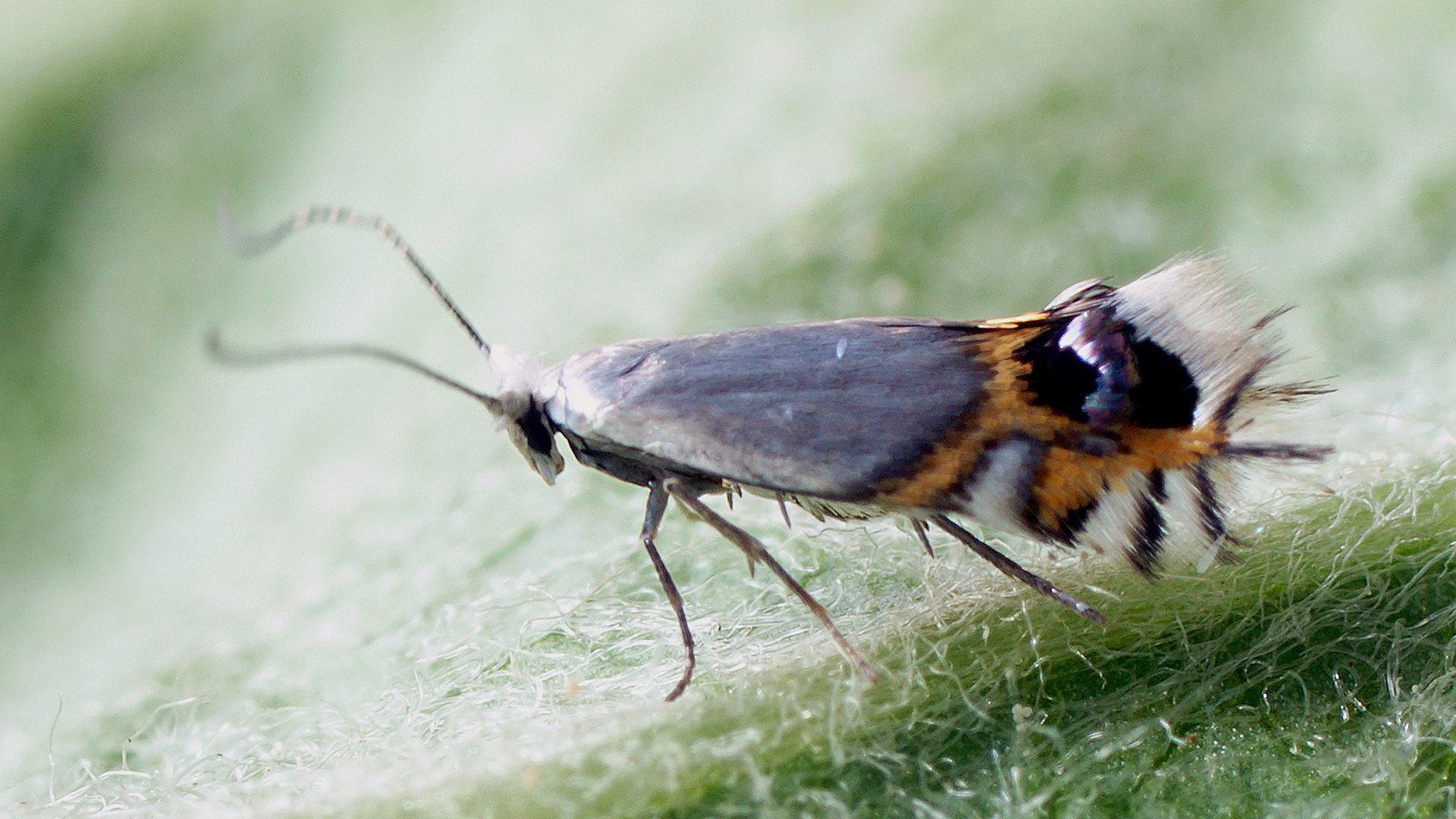
- Leucoptera malifoliella Moscow oblast

Scientific classification
- Domain: Eukaryota
- Kingdom: Animalia
- Phylum: Arthropoda
- Class: Insecta
- Order: Lepidoptera
- Family: Lyonetiidae
- Genus: Leucoptera
- Species: L. malifoliella

Binomial name
- Leucoptera malifoliella (O. Costa, 1836)

Synonyms
- Elachista malifoliella Costa, 1836; Opostega scitella Zeller, 1839; Cemiostoma scitellum (Zeller, 1839); Leucoptera scitella (Zeller, 1839)

= Leucoptera malifoliella =

Species of moth

Leucoptera malifoliella, the pear leaf blister moth, ribbed apple leaf miner or apple leaf miner, is a moth of the Lyonetiidae family that can be found in all of Europe.

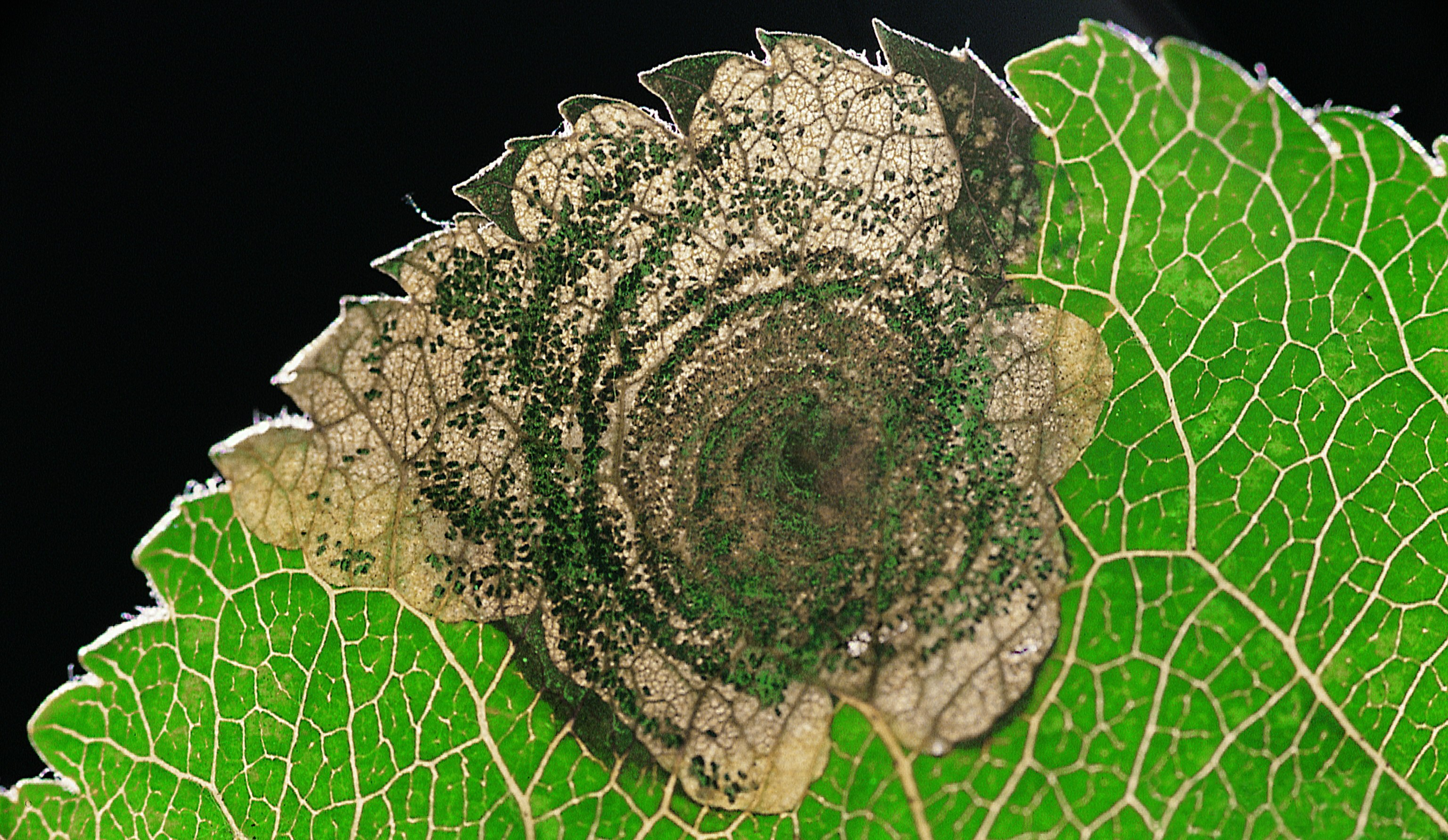
Mine

This wingspan is about 8 millimetres (0.31 in). It Differs from Leucoptera lotella as follows: forewings broader, post-tornal spot pale violet-golden, strongly black-margined on both sides, apex of wing orange, penultimate bar in cilia horizontal. The larva is green whitish; head and plate of 2 blackish

Adults are on wing from June to July.

The larvae feed on Alnus incana, Amelanchier ovalis, Aronia, Betula pendula, Betula pubescens, Chaenomeles japonica, Cotoneaster integerrimus, Crataegus crus-galli, Crataegus monogyna, Cydonia oblonga, Malus baccata, Malus domestica, Malus floribunda, Malus sylvestris, Mespilus germanica, Prunus avium, Prunus cerasus, Prunus domestica, Prunus fruticosa, Prunus insititia, Prunus spinosa, Prunus subhirtella, Pyrus communis and Sorbus aucuparia. They mine the leaves of their host plant.
