= Phyllobrostis fregenella =

Scientific classification
- Domain: Eukaryota
- Kingdom: Animalia
- Phylum: Arthropoda
- Class: Insecta
- Order: Lepidoptera
- Family: Lyonetiidae
- Genus: Phyllobrostis
- Species: P. fregenella

Binomial name
- Phyllobrostis fregenella Hartig, 1941

Species of moth

Phyllobrostis fregenella is a moth in the Lyonetiidae family. It is found in North Africa (Morocco, Tunisia) and in Southern Europe (Portugal, Spain, southern France, Corsica, mainland Italy, Sicily).

The wingspan is 6.2–7.5 mm for males and 8–9.5 mm for females. The larvae feed on Daphne gnidium. They mine the leaves of their host plant.
