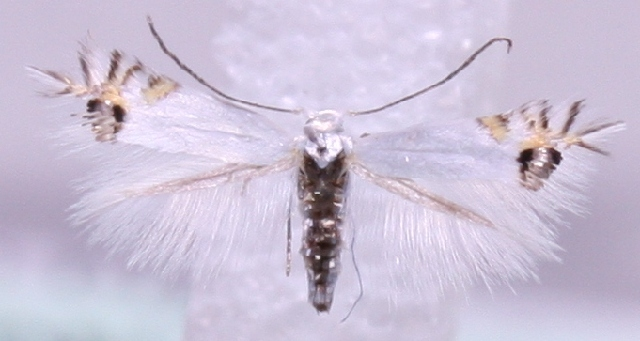

Scientific classification
- Kingdom: Animalia
- Phylum: Arthropoda
- Clade: Pancrustacea
- Class: Insecta
- Order: Lepidoptera
- Family: Lyonetiidae
- Genus: Leucoptera
- Species: L. orobi

Binomial name
- Leucoptera orobi (Stainton, 1869)

Synonyms
- Cemiostoma orobi Stainton, 1869

= Leucoptera orobi =

Species of moth

Leucoptera orobi is a moth in the family Lyonetiidae. It is found in Finland, Estonia, Ireland, Latvia and Scotland.

There are two generations in England. The first generation hatches from hibernated pupae during May, and the second generation flies during July. It seems to be single-brooded in Finland, with a flying period from early to late June.

The moth differs from Leucoptera lathyrifoliella as follows : forewings with last two dark bars in apical cilia much less divergent, forming an angle of about 15°.

The larvae feed on Lathyrus linifolius. They mine the leaves of their host plant.
