= Leucoptera smilaciella =

Scientific classification
- Domain: Eukaryota
- Kingdom: Animalia
- Phylum: Arthropoda
- Class: Insecta
- Order: Lepidoptera
- Family: Lyonetiidae
- Genus: Leucoptera
- Species: L. smilaciella

Binomial name
- Leucoptera smilaciella (Busck, 1900)

Synonyms
- Paraleucoptera smilaciella Busck, 1900

Species of moth

The greenbrier leaf miner (Leucoptera smilaciella) is a moth in the Lyonetiidae family. It is known from the United States, from Pennsylvania to Florida and Texas.

The larvae feed on Smilax species. They mine the leaves of their host plant. The mine has the form of a large, messy blotch.
