= Phyllobrostis jedmella =

Scientific classification
- Domain: Eukaryota
- Kingdom: Animalia
- Phylum: Arthropoda
- Class: Insecta
- Order: Lepidoptera
- Family: Lyonetiidae
- Genus: Phyllobrostis
- Species: P. jedmella

Binomial name
- Phyllobrostis jedmella Chretien, 1907

Species of moth

Phyllobrostis jedmella is a moth in the family Lyonetiidae. It is found in Algeria and Spain.

The wingspan is 5.5–6 mm for males. Adults are on wing in April. The larvae feed on Thymelaea microphylla, mining the leaves and flowers of their host plant.
