= Platacmaea cretiseca =

Scientific classification
- Kingdom: Animalia
- Phylum: Arthropoda
- Class: Insecta
- Order: Lepidoptera
- Family: Lyonetiidae
- Genus: Platacmaea
- Species: P. cretiseca

Binomial name
- Platacmaea cretiseca Meyrick, 1920

Species of moth

Platacmaea cretiseca is a moth in the family Lyonetiidae. It is known from Kenya.
