= Leucoptera karsholti =

Scientific classification
- Kingdom: Animalia
- Phylum: Arthropoda
- Clade: Pancrustacea
- Class: Insecta
- Order: Lepidoptera
- Family: Lyonetiidae
- Genus: Leucoptera
- Species: L. karsholti

Binomial name
- Leucoptera karsholti Mey, 1994

Species of moth

Leucoptera karsholti is a moth in the family Lyonetiidae. It is found in Morocco.

They probably mine the leaves of their host plant.
