= Leucoptera smilactis =

Scientific classification
- Kingdom: Animalia
- Phylum: Arthropoda
- Class: Insecta
- Order: Lepidoptera
- Family: Lyonetiidae
- Genus: Leucoptera
- Species: L. smilactis

Binomial name
- Leucoptera smilactis (Kuroko, 1964)

Synonyms
- Proleucoptera smilactis Kuroko, 1964

Species of moth

Leucoptera smilactis is a moth in the Lyonetiidae family that is known from Japan (Honshu, Kyushu).

The wingspan is 6–8 millimetres (0.24–0.31 in). Adults are on wing from the end of June and from the beginning to the end of August. Larvae of the autumn generation spin a cocoon at the beginning of November and hibernate. The adults appear in May of the following year. There are three generations per year.

The larvae feed on Smilax china. They mine the leaves of their host plant.
