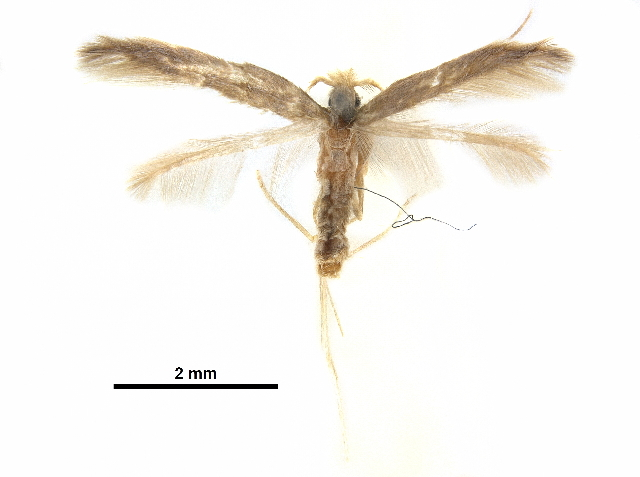

Scientific classification
- Kingdom: Animalia
- Phylum: Arthropoda
- Clade: Pancrustacea
- Class: Insecta
- Order: Lepidoptera
- Family: Lyonetiidae
- Genus: Taeniodictys; Forbes, 1933
- Species: T. sericella

Binomial name
- Taeniodictys sericella Forbes, 1933

= Taeniodictys =

Genus of moths

Taeniodictys is a monotypic moth genus belonging to the family Lyonetiidae described by William Trowbridge Merrifield Forbes in 1933. It contains only one species, Taeniodictys sericella, described by the same author in the same year, which is found in Puerto Rico.

Larvae have been recorded feeding on detritus in the nest of the paper wasp Polistes crinitus.

== Taxonomy ==
The genus was formerly included in the family Tineidae.
