= Leucoptera obelacma =

Scientific classification
- Kingdom: Animalia
- Phylum: Arthropoda
- Class: Insecta
- Order: Lepidoptera
- Family: Lyonetiidae
- Genus: Leucoptera
- Species: L. obelacma

Binomial name
- Leucoptera obelacma Meyrick, 1918

Species of moth

Leucoptera obelacma is a moth in the family Lyonetiidae. It is known from South Africa.
