= Leucoptera genistae =

Scientific classification
- Kingdom: Animalia
- Phylum: Arthropoda
- Class: Insecta
- Order: Lepidoptera
- Family: Lyonetiidae
- Genus: Leucoptera
- Species: L. genistae

Binomial name
- Leucoptera genistae (M. Hering, 1933)

Synonyms
- Cemiostoma genistae M. Hering, 1933

Species of moth

Leucoptera genistae is a moth in the family Lyonetiidae. It is found in France, Italy, Austria, Hungary and Bulgaria.

The larvae feed on Genista anglica and Genista germanica. They mine the leaves of their host plant. Pupation takes place outside of the mine.
