= Leucoptera crobylistis =

Scientific classification
- Domain: Eukaryota
- Kingdom: Animalia
- Phylum: Arthropoda
- Class: Insecta
- Order: Lepidoptera
- Family: Lyonetiidae
- Genus: Leucoptera
- Species: L. crobylistis

Binomial name
- Leucoptera crobylistis Meyrick, 1926

Species of moth

Leucoptera crobylistis is a species of moth in the Lyonetiidae family. Distribution of the species globally is unknown, but in Indian records it is known to be distributed in Karnataka.
