= Crobylophora xanthochyta =

Scientific classification
- Kingdom: Animalia
- Phylum: Arthropoda
- Clade: Pancrustacea
- Class: Insecta
- Order: Lepidoptera
- Family: Lyonetiidae
- Genus: Crobylophora
- Species: C. xanthochyta

Binomial name
- Crobylophora xanthochyta Meyrick, 1918

Species of moth

Crobylophora xanthochyta is a moth in the family Lyonetiidae that is endemic to South Africa.
