= Leucoptera auronivea =

Scientific classification
- Kingdom: Animalia
- Phylum: Arthropoda
- Clade: Pancrustacea
- Class: Insecta
- Order: Lepidoptera
- Family: Lyonetiidae
- Genus: Leucoptera
- Species: L. auronivea

Binomial name
- Leucoptera auronivea (Walker, 1875)

Synonyms
- Cemiostoma auronivea Walker, 1875

Species of moth

Leucoptera auronivea is a moth in the family Lyonetiidae that is known from Saint Helena.
