= Leucoptera onobrychidella =

Scientific classification
- Kingdom: Animalia
- Phylum: Arthropoda
- Clade: Pancrustacea
- Class: Insecta
- Order: Lepidoptera
- Family: Lyonetiidae
- Genus: Leucoptera
- Species: L. onobrychidella

Binomial name
- Leucoptera onobrychidella Klimesch, 1937

Species of moth

Leucoptera onobrychidella is a moth in the family Lyonetiidae. It is found from France to Poland and Hungary.

The larvae feed on Onobrychis arenaria, Onobrychis sativa and Onobrychis viciifolia. They mine the leaves of their host plant.
