= Phyllobrostis kandaharensis =

Scientific classification
- Kingdom: Animalia
- Phylum: Arthropoda
- Clade: Pancrustacea
- Class: Insecta
- Order: Lepidoptera
- Family: Lyonetiidae
- Genus: Phyllobrostis
- Species: P. kandaharensis

Binomial name
- Phyllobrostis kandaharensis Mey, 2006

Species of moth

Phyllobrostis kandaharensis is a moth in the Lyonetiidae family. It is only known from Kandahar in Afghanistan.

The wingspan is 5.2–6.2 mm for males.
