= Leucoptera pulchricola =

Scientific classification
- Kingdom: Animalia
- Phylum: Arthropoda
- Class: Insecta
- Order: Lepidoptera
- Family: Lyonetiidae
- Genus: Leucoptera
- Species: L. pulchricola

Binomial name
- Leucoptera pulchricola Vári, 1955

Species of moth

Leucoptera pulchricola is a moth in the family Lyonetiidae. It is known from South Africa.

The larvae feed on Ochna pulchra.
