= Bedellia struthionella =

Scientific classification
- Domain: Eukaryota
- Kingdom: Animalia
- Phylum: Arthropoda
- Class: Insecta
- Order: Lepidoptera
- Family: Bedelliidae
- Genus: Bedellia
- Species: B. struthionella

Binomial name
- Bedellia struthionella Walsingham, 1907

Species of moth

Bedellia struthionella is a moth of the family Bedelliidae. It was first described by Lord Walsingham in 1907. It is endemic to the Hawaiian islands of Oahu and Hawaii.

The larvae feed on Panicum torridum. They mine the leaves of their host plant.
