= Microthauma glycinella =

Scientific classification
- Kingdom: Animalia
- Phylum: Arthropoda
- Class: Insecta
- Order: Lepidoptera
- Family: Lyonetiidae
- Genus: Microthauma
- Species: M. glycinella

Binomial name
- Microthauma glycinella Kuroko, 1964

Species of moth

Microthauma glycinella is a moth in the Lyonetiidae family. It is known from Japan (Kyushu and Okinawa).

The wingspan is 5.5–6 mm. Adults are on wing from the end of July, from the end of August to the beginning of September and from the beginning to the end of October. There are three generations per year.
