= Leucoptera celastrella =

Scientific classification
- Kingdom: Animalia
- Phylum: Arthropoda
- Class: Insecta
- Order: Lepidoptera
- Family: Lyonetiidae
- Genus: Leucoptera
- Species: L. celastrella

Binomial name
- Leucoptera celastrella (Kuroko, 1964)

Synonyms
- Proleucoptera celastrella Kuroko, 1964

Species of moth

Leucoptera celastrella is a moth in the family Lyonetiidae that is known from Japan (Hokkaido, Honshu, Kyushu).

The wingspan is 6.5–8.5 millimetres (0.26–0.33 in). Adults are on wing from the middle of May to the beginning of June. There are two generations per year.

The larvae feed on Tripterygium regelii, Celastrus orbiculatus and Euonymus alatus. They mine the leaves of their host plant.
