= Leucoptera puerariella =

Scientific classification
- Kingdom: Animalia
- Phylum: Arthropoda
- Class: Insecta
- Order: Lepidoptera
- Family: Lyonetiidae
- Genus: Leucoptera
- Species: L. puerariella

Binomial name
- Leucoptera puerariella Kuroko, 1964

Species of moth

Leucoptera puerariella is a moth in the Lyonetiidae family. It is known from Japan (Honshu, Kyushu).

The wingspan is 4–5 millimetres (0.16–0.20 in). Adults are on wing from the end of July and again from May. There are two to three generations per year.

The larvae feed on Pueraria lobata. They mine the leaves of their host plant.
