= Leucoptera ermolaevi =

Scientific classification
- Domain: Eukaryota
- Kingdom: Animalia
- Phylum: Arthropoda
- Class: Insecta
- Order: Lepidoptera
- Family: Lyonetiidae
- Genus: Leucoptera
- Species: L. ermolaevi

Binomial name
- Leucoptera ermolaevi Seksjaeva, 1990

Species of moth

Leucoptera ermolaevi is a species of moth in the family Lyonetiidae. It is found in the Russian oblast of Primorsky.
