= Phyllobrostis farsensis =

Scientific classification
- Kingdom: Animalia
- Phylum: Arthropoda
- Clade: Pancrustacea
- Class: Insecta
- Order: Lepidoptera
- Family: Lyonetiidae
- Genus: Phyllobrostis
- Species: P. farsensis

Binomial name
- Phyllobrostis farsensis Mey, 2006

Species of moth

Phyllobrostis farsensis is a moth in the Lyonetiidae family. It is only known from Fars in Iran.

The wingspan is about 7 mm for the holotype, a male.
