= Phyllobrostis apathetica =

Scientific classification
- Domain: Eukaryota
- Kingdom: Animalia
- Phylum: Arthropoda
- Class: Insecta
- Order: Lepidoptera
- Family: Lyonetiidae
- Genus: Phyllobrostis
- Species: P. apathetica

Binomial name
- Phyllobrostis apathetica (Meyrick, 1921)

Synonyms
- Phthinostoma apathetica Meyrick, 1921

Species of moth

Phyllobrostis apathetica is a moth in the family Lyonetiidae. Endemic to South Africa, it is only known from Pretoria, its type locality.

The wingspan is about 14 mm. The forewings are white and the hindwings are grey.
