= Leucoptera coma =

Scientific classification
- Kingdom: Animalia
- Phylum: Arthropoda
- Class: Insecta
- Order: Lepidoptera
- Family: Lyonetiidae
- Genus: Leucoptera
- Species: L. coma

Binomial name
- Leucoptera coma Ghesquière, 1940

Species of moth

Leucoptera coma is a moth in the family Lyonetiidae. It is found in Zaire and Uganda. It is considered a pest species on coffee.

The larvae feed on Coffea arabica and other Coffea species. They mine the leaves of their host plant.
