= Leucoptera nieukerkeni =

Scientific classification
- Kingdom: Animalia
- Phylum: Arthropoda
- Clade: Pancrustacea
- Class: Insecta
- Order: Lepidoptera
- Family: Lyonetiidae
- Genus: Leucoptera
- Species: L. nieukerkeni

Binomial name
- Leucoptera nieukerkeni Mey, 1994

Species of moth

Leucoptera nieukerkeni is a moth in the family Lyonetiidae. It is endemic to Greece.

The larvae feed on Acer monspessulanum. They probably mine the leaves of their host plant.
