= Leucoedemia ingens =

Scientific classification
- Kingdom: Animalia
- Phylum: Arthropoda
- Clade: Pancrustacea
- Class: Insecta
- Order: Lepidoptera
- Family: Lyonetiidae
- Genus: Leucoedemia
- Species: L. ingens

Binomial name
- Leucoedemia ingens Scoble & Scholtz, 1984

Synonyms
- Bucculatrix ingens

Species of moth in the family Lyonetiidae

Leucoedemia ingens is a moth in the family Lyonetiidae. It is found in South Africa.
