= Leucoptera coronillae =

Scientific classification
- Kingdom: Animalia
- Phylum: Arthropoda
- Class: Insecta
- Order: Lepidoptera
- Family: Lyonetiidae
- Genus: Leucoptera
- Species: L. coronillae

Binomial name
- Leucoptera coronillae (M. Hering, 1933)

Synonyms
- Cemiostoma coronillae M. Hering, 1933

Species of moth

Leucoptera coronillae is a moth in the family Lyonetiidae. It is found in southern France, Spain, Sardinia and mainland Italy.

The larvae feed on Cytisus sessilifolius and Cytisus villosus. They mine the leaves of their host plant.
