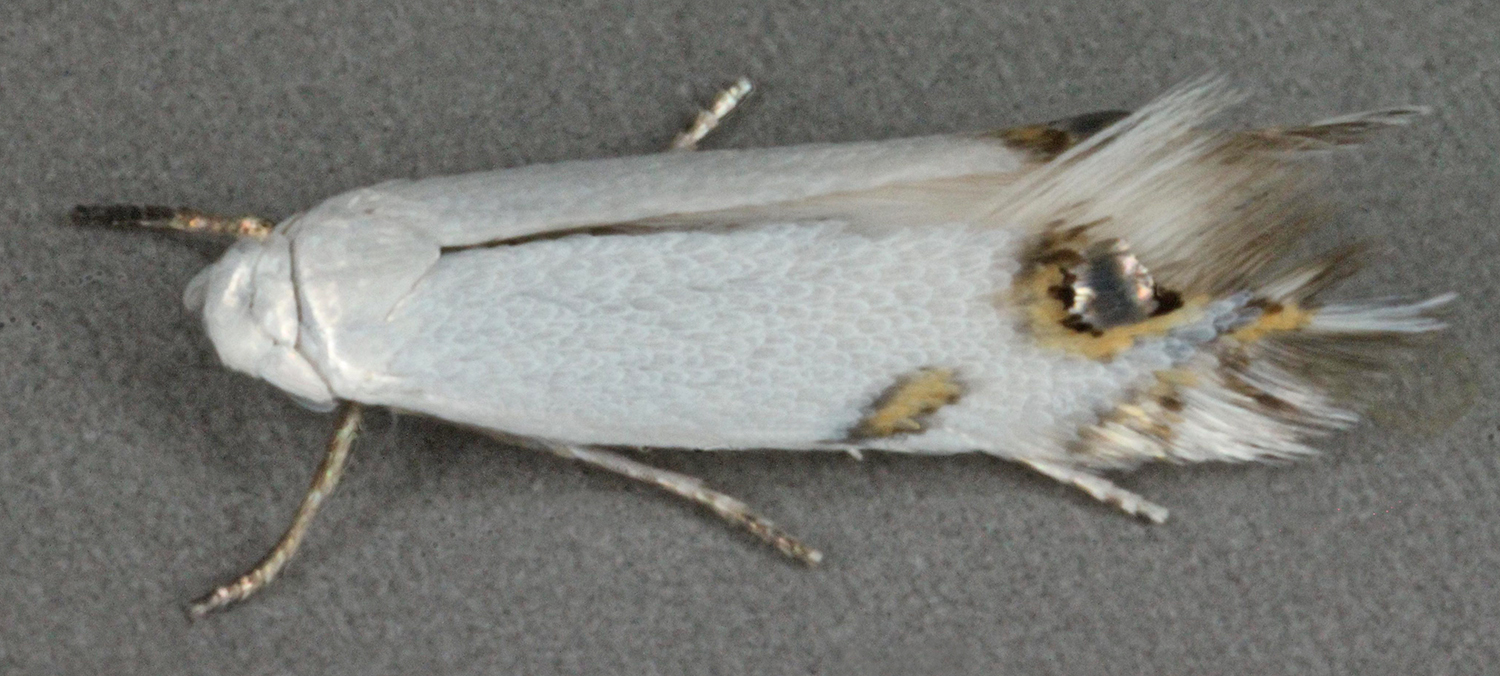
- Leucoptera spartifoliella Borras Quarry, North Wales

Scientific classification
- Kingdom: Animalia
- Phylum: Arthropoda
- Clade: Pancrustacea
- Class: Insecta
- Order: Lepidoptera
- Family: Lyonetiidae
- Genus: Leucoptera
- Species: L. spartifoliella

Binomial name
- Leucoptera spartifoliella (Hübner, 1813)

Synonyms
- Tinea spartifoliella Hübner, 1813; Tinea punctaurella Haworth, 1828; Leucoptera cytisanthi Deschka, 1972

= Leucoptera spartifoliella =

Species of moth

Leucoptera spartifoliella is a species of moth in family Lyonetiidae known by the common name Scotch broom twig miner. It is used as an agent of biological pest control against the noxious weed known as Scotch broom (Cytisus scoparius).

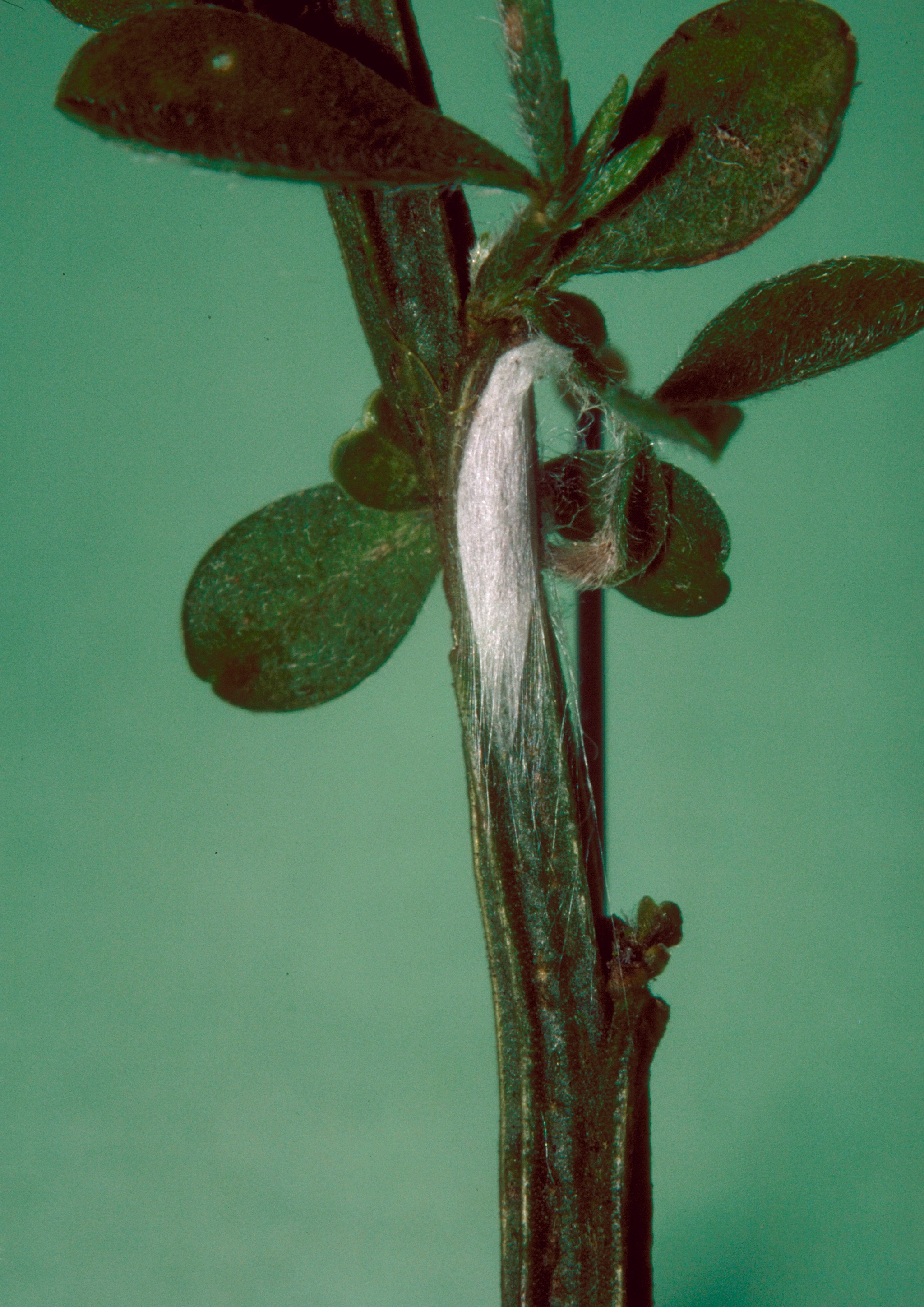
Pupa

The adult is a tiny white moth about four millimeters long. It differs from Leucoptera laburnella as follows : forewings with anteapical spot of costa more oblique, its margins rather converging downwards, metallic post-tornal spot more broadly black-edged, usually preceded by a yellowish mark.

It lays eggs one at a time on the stem of Scotch broom, its host plant. The larva burrows throughout the epidermis of the stem for nearly a year before it pupates, causing damage to the plant.

The moth was introduced to California for the purpose of controlling Scotch broom in 1960. It is now established in parts of the western United States. It was introduced to Australia in 1990. It may or may not be a worthwhile biocontrol agent; while the insect does do considerable damage to the plants, they can often recover. Much of the plant deaths occur when insect damage makes the plant susceptible to disease. Research is now focused on other agents of biocontrol for Scotch broom.

In the 1950s the moth was accidentally introduced to New Zealand. It has since become established. It has caused localized die-backs of scotch broom throughout the country.
