= Copobathra menodora =

Scientific classification
- Kingdom: Animalia
- Phylum: Arthropoda
- Class: Insecta
- Order: Lepidoptera
- Family: Lyonetiidae
- Genus: Copobathra
- Species: C. menodora

Binomial name
- Copobathra menodora Meyrick, 1911

Species of moth

Copobathra menodora is a moth in the family Lyonetiidae. It is known from South Africa.
