= Leucoptera meyricki =

Scientific classification
- Kingdom: Animalia
- Phylum: Arthropoda
- Class: Insecta
- Order: Lepidoptera
- Family: Lyonetiidae
- Genus: Leucoptera
- Species: L. meyricki

Binomial name
- Leucoptera meyricki Ghesquière, 1940

Species of moth

Leucoptera meyricki is a moth in the family Lyonetiidae that is found in Ivory Coast, Angola, Congo, East Africa, Ethiopia and Madagascar. It was also discovered in Kenya and Tanzania. It is considered one of the worst pest species on coffee.

The larvae feed on Coffea arabica and other Coffea species. They mine the leaves of their host plant.
