= Phyllobrostis calcaria =

Scientific classification
- Domain: Eukaryota
- Kingdom: Animalia
- Phylum: Arthropoda
- Class: Insecta
- Order: Lepidoptera
- Family: Lyonetiidae
- Genus: Phyllobrostis
- Species: P. calcaria

Binomial name
- Phyllobrostis calcaria Meyrick, 1911

Species of moth

Phyllobrostis calcaria is a moth in the family Lyonetiidae. Endemic to South Africa, it is only known from Pretoria, its type locality.

The wingspan is about 13.5 mm for males.
