= Leucoptera oxyphyllella =

Scientific classification
- Kingdom: Animalia
- Phylum: Arthropoda
- Class: Insecta
- Order: Lepidoptera
- Family: Lyonetiidae
- Genus: Leucoptera
- Species: L. oxyphyllella

Binomial name
- Leucoptera oxyphyllella (Kuroko, 1964)

Synonyms
- Proleucoptera oxyphyllella Kuroko, 1964

Species of moth

Leucoptera oxyphyllella is a moth in the Lyonetiidae family. It is known from Kyushu island of Japan.

The wingspan is about 8 mm. Adults are on wing from the beginning of August and again from the beginning of May. There are two generations per year.

The larvae feed on Euonymus oxyphyllus. They mine the leaves of their host plant.
