= Leucoptera calycotomella =

Scientific classification
- Kingdom: Animalia
- Phylum: Arthropoda
- Class: Insecta
- Order: Lepidoptera
- Family: Lyonetiidae
- Genus: Leucoptera
- Species: L. calycotomella

Binomial name
- Leucoptera calycotomella Amsel, 1939

Species of moth

Leucoptera calycotomella is a moth in the family Lyonetiidae. It is found in Corsica, Sardinia and mainland Italy.
