= Microthauma lespedezella =

Scientific classification
- Domain: Eukaryota
- Kingdom: Animalia
- Phylum: Arthropoda
- Class: Insecta
- Order: Lepidoptera
- Family: Lyonetiidae
- Genus: Microthauma
- Species: M. lespedezella

Binomial name
- Microthauma lespedezella Seksjaeva, 1990

Species of moth

Microtauma lespedezella is a species of moth in the family Lyonetiidae. It has been recorded in the Russian Far East and Japan (Hokkaido, Honshu).

It feeds on Lespedeza bicolor and Leguminosae Cyrtobotrya.

Its wingspan is about 7 to 9 millimetres (0.28 to 0.35 in).
