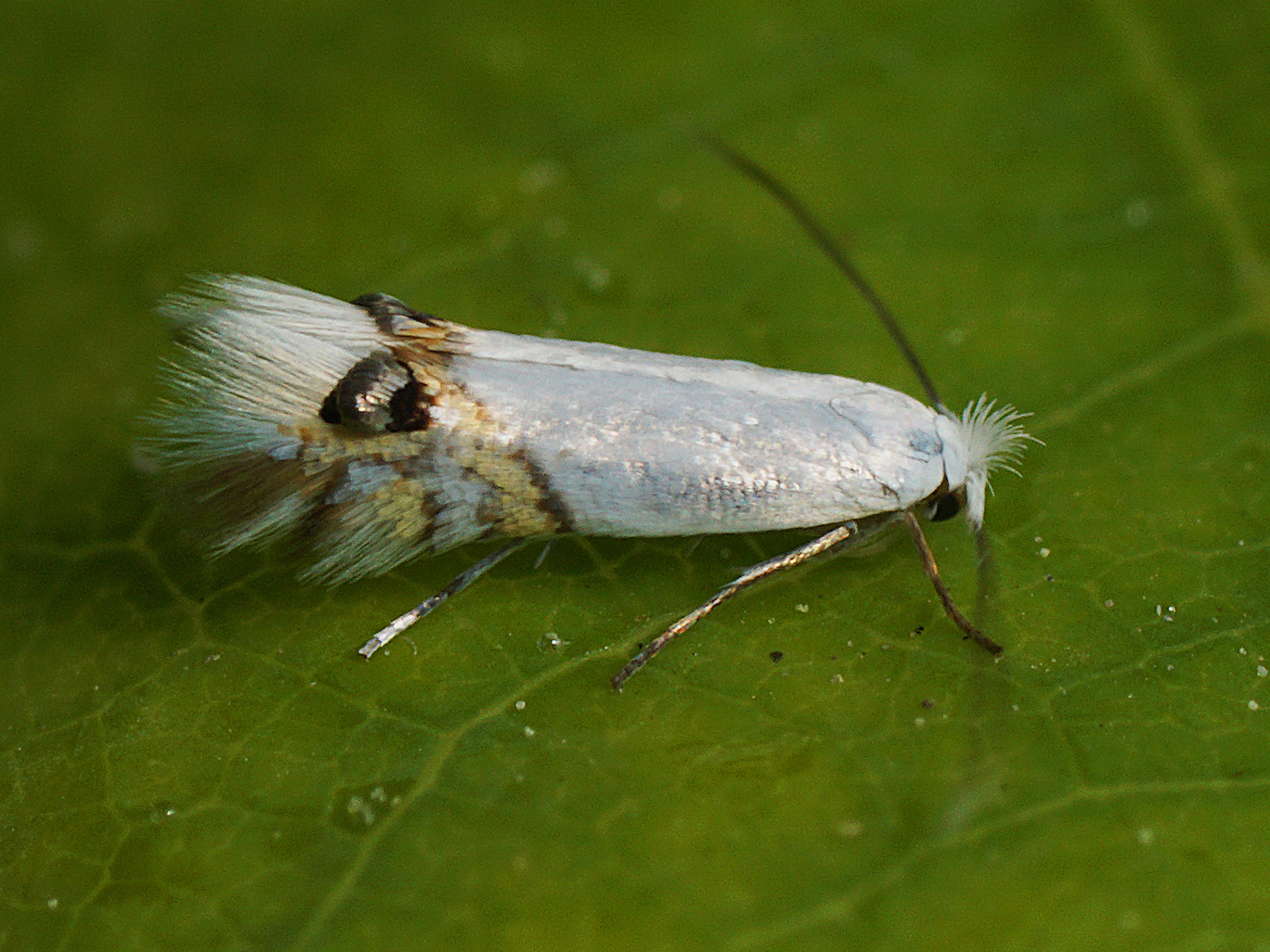

Scientific classification
- Kingdom: Animalia
- Phylum: Arthropoda
- Clade: Pancrustacea
- Class: Insecta
- Order: Lepidoptera
- Family: Lyonetiidae
- Genus: Leucoptera
- Species: L. sinuella

Binomial name
- Leucoptera sinuella (Reutti, 1853)

Synonyms
- Cemiostoma sinuella Reutti, 1853; Paraleucoptera sinuella; Cemiostoma susinella Herrich-Schäffer, 1855; Leucoptera susinella

= Leucoptera sinuella =

Scotch bent-wing

Species of moth

Leucoptera sinuella, also known as the scotch bent-wing, is a moth in the family Lyonetiidae. It is found in most of Europe, except Ireland, the Balkan Peninsula and the Mediterranean Islands. It is also found in Japan (Hokkaido, Honshu) and North Africa. It is also invasive to South America, mainly in Argentina and Chile, and has been present there since 2015.

The wingspan is about 7–8 millimetres (0.28–0.31 in).

== Eggs ==
Eggs are deposited on the upperside of the leaf, mostly in groups of 5–10 along a vein. Although rare, a single egg can also be deposited. The empty shells are flat, circular and shining.

== Larvae ==
The larvae have a head and chewing mouthparts with opposable mandibles, and six thoracic and abdominal legs.

The larvae feed on Populus alba, Populus candicans, Populus deltoides, Populus gileadensis, Populus nigra, Populus tremula, Salix aurita, Salix caprea, Salix cinerea, Salix fragilis, Salix purpurea.

A larva forms a large, black-centred blotch on the upper surface of a leaf before mining the leaves of their host plant. There are sometimes several larvae to a leaf as mines may merge.

== Pupa ==
The pupae have visible head appendages, wings and legs which lie in sheaths.

Pupation is solitary and external, under a conspicuous white spinning in the shape of the letter "H". Pupation occurs mostly on a leaf. There is an exit slit in the upper epidermis.
