= Cemiostominae =

Scientific classification
- Kingdom: Animalia
- Phylum: Arthropoda
- Clade: Pancrustacea
- Class: Insecta
- Order: Lepidoptera
- Family: Lyonetiidae
- Subfamily: Cemiostominae; Spuler, 1898

Genera
- Leucoptera Hübner, 1825; Microthauma Walsingham, 1891; Crobylophora Meyrick, 1880

Subfamily of moths

Cemiostominae is a subfamily of moths in the family Lyonetiidae.
