= Leucoptera albella =

Scientific classification
- Kingdom: Animalia
- Phylum: Arthropoda
- Clade: Pancrustacea
- Class: Insecta
- Order: Lepidoptera
- Family: Lyonetiidae
- Genus: Leucoptera
- Species: L. albella

Binomial name
- Leucoptera albella (Chambers, 1871)

Synonyms
- Paraleucoptera albella

Species of moth

Leucoptera albella, the cottonwood leaf miner, is a moth in the family Lyonetiidae. It is known from North America and is probably present throughout the commercial range of cottonwood.

The larvae feed on Populus deltoides. They mine the leaves of their host plant. Periodic heavy infestations may destroy half the total leaf surface and reduce growth of young cottonwood.
