= Leucoptera parinaricola =

Scientific classification
- Kingdom: Animalia
- Phylum: Arthropoda
- Class: Insecta
- Order: Lepidoptera
- Family: Lyonetiidae
- Genus: Leucoptera
- Species: L. parinaricola

Binomial name
- Leucoptera parinaricola Vári, 1955

Species of moth

Leucoptera parinaricola is a moth in the family Lyonetiidae that is endemic to South Africa.

The larvae feed on Parinari capensis.
