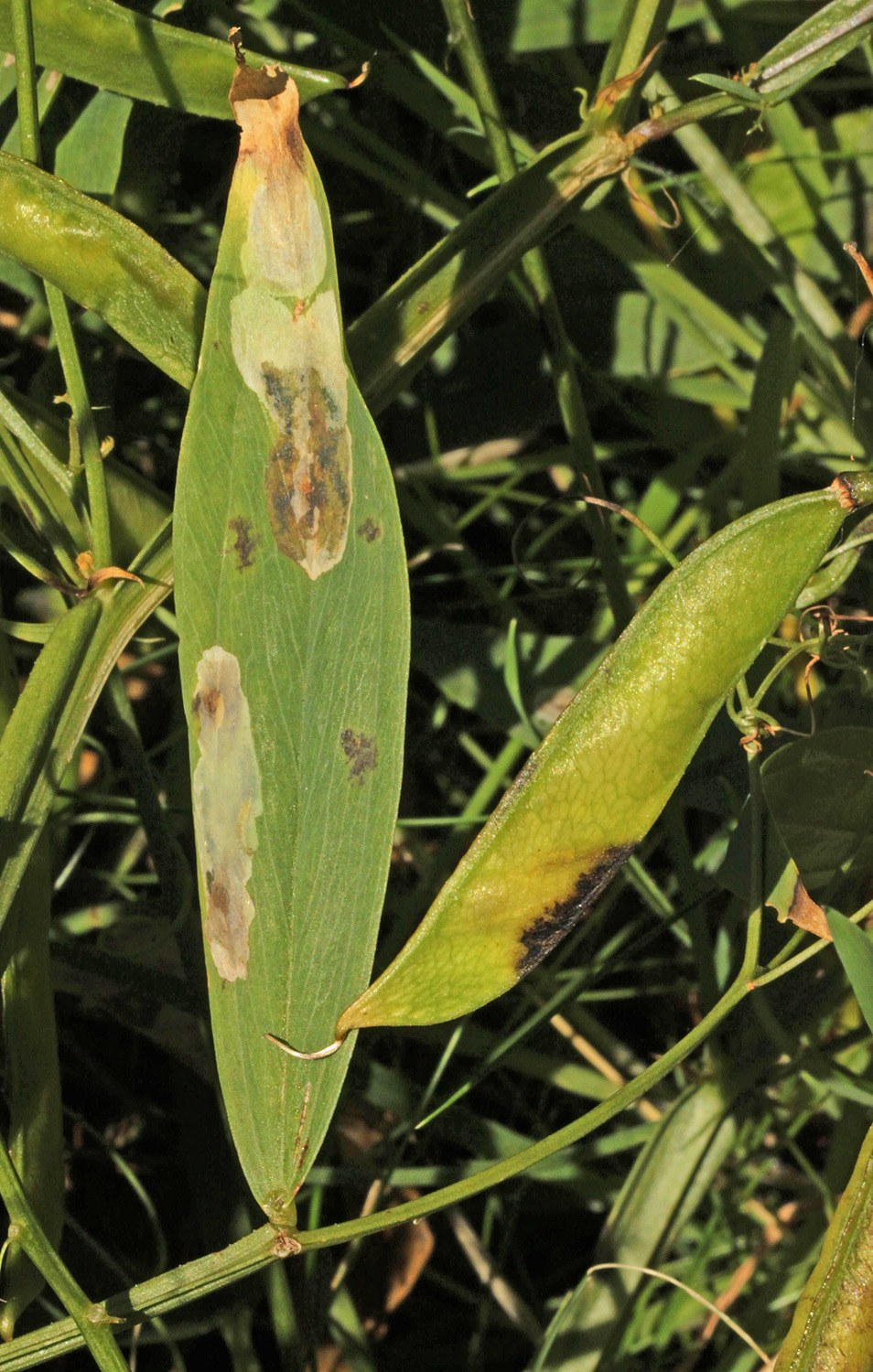

Scientific classification
- Kingdom: Animalia
- Phylum: Arthropoda
- Clade: Pancrustacea
- Class: Insecta
- Order: Lepidoptera
- Family: Lyonetiidae
- Genus: Leucoptera
- Species: L. lathyrifoliella

Binomial name
- Leucoptera lathyrifoliella (Stainton, 1866)

Synonyms
- Cemiostoma lathyrifoliella Stainton, 1866

= Leucoptera lathyrifoliella =

Species of moth

Leucoptera lathyrifoliella is a moth in the Lyonetiidae family. It is found in England, Finland, Germany, Slovakia, and Romania.

The moth differs from Leucoptera laburnella as follows: forewings with postmedian costal bar longer, touching yellow upper margin of post-tornal spot, dark edgings sharper-marked, apex of wing dark fuscous; hindwings rather dark grey.

The larvae feed on Lathyrus linifolius, Lathyrus pratensis and Lathyrus sylvestris. They mine the leaves of their host plant. The mine has the form of a flat, upper-surface, oval blotch without a preceding gallery, with clear greenish frass. There may be more than one mine in a single leaflet sometimes merging. Pupation takes place outside of the mine.
