= Leucoptera caffeina =

Scientific classification
- Kingdom: Animalia
- Phylum: Arthropoda
- Clade: Pancrustacea
- Class: Insecta
- Order: Lepidoptera
- Family: Lyonetiidae
- Genus: Leucoptera
- Species: L. caffeina

Binomial name
- Leucoptera caffeina Washburn, 1940

Species of moth

Leucoptera caffeina is a species of moth in the family Lyonetiidae. It was described by entomologist Richard E. Washburn in 1940. This leaf miner is one of several related pests on Coffea species. It is found in Angola, Zaire, Kenya and Tanzania in Africa. Other coffee leafminers include Leucoptera coffeella.
