= Bedellia oplismeniella =

Scientific classification
- Domain: Eukaryota
- Kingdom: Animalia
- Phylum: Arthropoda
- Class: Insecta
- Order: Lepidoptera
- Family: Bedelliidae
- Genus: Bedellia
- Species: B. oplismeniella

Binomial name
- Bedellia oplismeniella Swezey, 1912

Species of moth

Bedellia oplismeniella is a moth of the family Bedelliidae. It was first described by Otto Swezey in 1912. It is endemic to the Hawaiian Islands, specifically to Oahu and possibly Molokai and Hawaii.

The larvae feed on Oplismenus compositus and Panicum torridum. They mine the leaves of their host plant.
