= Leucoptera adenocarpella =

Scientific classification
- Domain: Eukaryota
- Kingdom: Animalia
- Phylum: Arthropoda
- Class: Insecta
- Order: Lepidoptera
- Family: Lyonetiidae
- Genus: Leucoptera
- Species: L. adenocarpella

Binomial name
- Leucoptera adenocarpella (Staudinger, 1871)

Synonyms
- Cemiostoma adenocarpella Staudinger, 1871

Species of moth

Leucoptera adenocarpella is a moth in the family Lyonetiidae that is endemic to the Iberian Peninsula.
