= Phyllobrostis argillosa =

Scientific classification
- Domain: Eukaryota
- Kingdom: Animalia
- Phylum: Arthropoda
- Class: Insecta
- Order: Lepidoptera
- Family: Lyonetiidae
- Genus: Phyllobrostis
- Species: P. argillosa

Binomial name
- Phyllobrostis argillosa Meyrick, 1911

Species of moth

Phyllobrostis argillosa is a moth in the Lyonetiidae family. Endemic to South Africa, it is only known from a single male from Kranspoort near Pretoria.

In 2006 Wolfram Mey argued that Phyllobrostis argillosa is misplaced in Lyonetiidae and even in Yponomeutoidea and that it should probably be placed in the superfamily Tineoidea, probably in Tineidae. However, later treatments have kept recognizing Phyllobrostis argillosa as valid species in Lyonetiidae.
