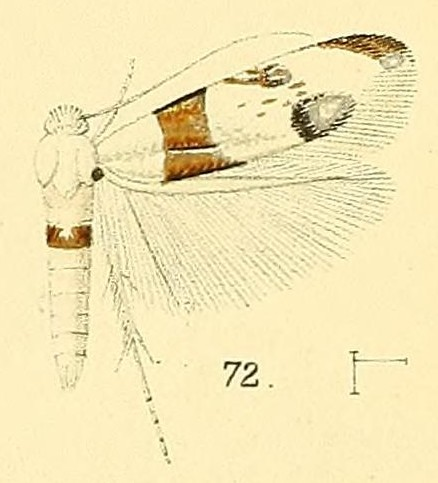

Scientific classification
- Kingdom: Animalia
- Phylum: Arthropoda
- Class: Insecta
- Order: Lepidoptera
- Family: Lyonetiidae
- Genus: Micropostega
- Species: M. aeneofasciata

Binomial name
- Micropostega aeneofasciata Walsingham, 1891

= Micropostega aeneofasciata =

Species of moth

Micropostega aeneofasciata is a moth in the family Lyonetiidae. It is known from Gambia.
