= Phyllobrostis nuristanica =

Scientific classification
- Kingdom: Animalia
- Phylum: Arthropoda
- Clade: Pancrustacea
- Class: Insecta
- Order: Lepidoptera
- Family: Lyonetiidae
- Genus: Phyllobrostis
- Species: P. nuristanica

Binomial name
- Phyllobrostis nuristanica Mey, 2006

Species of moth

Phyllobrostis nuristanica is a moth in the Lyonetiidae family. It is only known from Konarha in Afghanistan.

The wingspan is about 7 mm in the type series (a male (holotype) and a female).
