= Leucoptera psophocarpella =

Scientific classification
- Domain: Eukaryota
- Kingdom: Animalia
- Phylum: Arthropoda
- Class: Insecta
- Order: Lepidoptera
- Family: Lyonetiidae
- Genus: Leucoptera
- Species: L. psophocarpella

Binomial name
- Leucoptera psophocarpella Bradley & Carter, 1982

Species of moth

Leucoptera psophocarpella, the winged-bean blotch miner, is a moth in the Lyonetiidae family that is endemic to Papua New Guinea.

The wingspan is about 4 millimetres (0.16 in).

The larvae feed on Psophocarpus tetragonolobus. They mine the leaves of their host plant.
