= Leucoptera thessalica =

Scientific classification
- Kingdom: Animalia
- Phylum: Arthropoda
- Clade: Pancrustacea
- Class: Insecta
- Order: Lepidoptera
- Family: Lyonetiidae
- Genus: Leucoptera
- Species: L. thessalica

Binomial name
- Leucoptera thessalica Mey, 1994

Species of moth

Leucoptera thessalica is a moth in the family Lyonetiidae. It is found in Greece.

They probably mine the leaves of their host plant.
