= Leucoptera astragali =

Scientific classification
- Kingdom: Animalia
- Phylum: Arthropoda
- Clade: Pancrustacea
- Class: Insecta
- Order: Lepidoptera
- Family: Lyonetiidae
- Genus: Leucoptera
- Species: L. astragali

Binomial name
- Leucoptera astragali Mey & Corley, 1999

Species of moth

Leucoptera astragali is a moth in the family Lyonetiidae that can be found in Portugal and Tunisia.

The larvae feed on Astragalus lusitanicus. They mine the leaves of their host plant.
