= Leucoptera sphenograpta =

Scientific classification
- Kingdom: Animalia
- Phylum: Arthropoda
- Class: Insecta
- Order: Lepidoptera
- Family: Lyonetiidae
- Genus: Leucoptera
- Species: L. sphenograpta

Binomial name
- Leucoptera sphenograpta Meyrick, 1911

Species of moth

Leucoptera sphenograpta is a moth in the Lyonetiidae family. It is found in India (Uttar Pradesh).

== Biology ==
This species has a wingspan of 6-7mm. It completes 10 to 12 generations in a year and its host plant is Dalbergia sissoo (Indian rosewood) (Fabaceae) but has also become a pest on Poplar.

== See also ==
- Leucoptera (moth)
