= Crobylophora staterias =

Scientific classification
- Kingdom: Animalia
- Phylum: Arthropoda
- Class: Insecta
- Order: Lepidoptera
- Family: Lyonetiidae
- Genus: Crobylophora
- Species: C. staterias

Binomial name
- Crobylophora staterias Meyrick, 1905

Species of moth

Crobylophora staterias is a moth of the family Stathmopodidae first described by Edward Meyrick in 1905. It is found in India and Sri Lanka.
