= Phyllobrostis hartmanni =

Scientific classification
- Domain: Eukaryota
- Kingdom: Animalia
- Phylum: Arthropoda
- Class: Insecta
- Order: Lepidoptera
- Family: Lyonetiidae
- Genus: Phyllobrostis
- Species: P. hartmanni

Binomial name
- Phyllobrostis hartmanni Staudinger, 1867

Species of moth

Phyllobrostis hartmanni is a moth in the family Lyonetiidae. It is found in the Alps and the surrounding areas in Switzerland, France, Germany, Austria, Italy, and Slovakia.

The wingspan is 6.5–7.2 mm for males and 7–8 mm for females. The larvae feed on Daphne alpina, Daphne cneorum, and Daphne striata. They mine the leaves of their host plant.
