= Leucoptera zanclaeella =

Scientific classification
- Kingdom: Animalia
- Phylum: Arthropoda
- Clade: Pancrustacea
- Class: Insecta
- Order: Lepidoptera
- Family: Lyonetiidae
- Genus: Leucoptera
- Species: L. zanclaeella

Binomial name
- Leucoptera zanclaeella (Zeller, 1848)

Synonyms
- Cemiostoma zanclaeella Zeller, 1848

Species of moth

Leucoptera zanclaeella is a moth in the family Lyonetiidae. It is found in Sicily, Dalmatia and France.

The larvae feed on Cytisus villosus. They probably mine the leaves of their host plant.
