= Leucoptera scammatias =

Scientific classification
- Kingdom: Animalia
- Phylum: Arthropoda
- Class: Insecta
- Order: Lepidoptera
- Family: Lyonetiidae
- Genus: Leucoptera
- Species: L. scammatias

Binomial name
- Leucoptera scammatias Meyrick, 1909

Species of moth

Leucoptera scammatias is a moth in the family Lyonetiidae that is endemic to South Africa.
