= Leucoptera autograpta =

Scientific classification
- Kingdom: Animalia
- Phylum: Arthropoda
- Class: Insecta
- Order: Lepidoptera
- Family: Lyonetiidae
- Genus: Leucoptera
- Species: L. autograpta

Binomial name
- Leucoptera autograpta Meyrick, 1918

Species of moth

Leucoptera autograpta is a moth in the family Lyonetiidae that is endemic to South Africa.
