= Phyllobrostis tephroleuca =

Scientific classification
- Domain: Eukaryota
- Kingdom: Animalia
- Phylum: Arthropoda
- Class: Insecta
- Order: Lepidoptera
- Family: Lyonetiidae
- Genus: Phyllobrostis
- Species: P. tephroleuca

Binomial name
- Phyllobrostis tephroleuca (Meyrick, 1913)

Synonyms
- Pilotocoma tephroleuca Meyrick, 1913

Species of moth

Phyllobrostis tephroleuca or Pilotocoma tephroleuca is a moth in the family Lyonetiidae. It is found in South Africa (Transvaal, Natal) and Zimbabwe.

The wingspan is 10–10.3 mm for males and 10.8–11 mm for females.
