= Leucoptera cytisiphagella =

Scientific classification
- Kingdom: Animalia
- Phylum: Arthropoda
- Clade: Pancrustacea
- Class: Insecta
- Order: Lepidoptera
- Family: Lyonetiidae
- Genus: Leucoptera
- Species: L. cytisiphagella

Binomial name
- Leucoptera cytisiphagella Klimesch, 1938

Species of moth

Leucoptera cytisiphagella is a moth in the family Lyonetiidae. It is found in Hungary and Bulgaria.

The larvae feed on Chamaecytisus austriacus. They mine the leaves of their host plant. Pupation takes place outside of the mine.
