= Leucoptera selenocycla =

Scientific classification
- Kingdom: Animalia
- Phylum: Arthropoda
- Class: Insecta
- Order: Lepidoptera
- Family: Lyonetiidae
- Genus: Leucoptera
- Species: L. selenocycla

Binomial name
- Leucoptera selenocycla Meyrick, 1930

Species of moth

Leucoptera selenocycla is a moth in the family Lyonetiidae first described by Edward Meyrick in 1930. It is found in India.
