= Leucoptera aceris =

Scientific classification
- Kingdom: Animalia
- Phylum: Arthropoda
- Class: Insecta
- Order: Lepidoptera
- Family: Lyonetiidae
- Genus: Leucoptera
- Species: L. aceris

Binomial name
- Leucoptera aceris (Fuchs, 1903)

Synonyms
- Cemiostoma aceris Fuchs, 1903

Species of moth

Leucoptera aceris is a moth in the family Lyonetiidae. It is found from Latvia to the Pyrenees, Alps and Bulgaria. It has also been recorded from Portugal.

The larvae feed on Acer campestre, Acer monspessulanum and Acer platanoides.
