= Leucoptera andalusica =

Scientific classification
- Kingdom: Animalia
- Phylum: Arthropoda
- Clade: Pancrustacea
- Class: Insecta
- Order: Lepidoptera
- Family: Lyonetiidae
- Genus: Leucoptera
- Species: L. andalusica

Binomial name
- Leucoptera andalusica Mey, 1994

Species of moth

Leucoptera andalusica is a moth in the family Lyonetiidae and is endemic to the Iberian Peninsula.

The larvae feed on Chamaespartium tridentatum, mining either in the stems or along the broad wings of the stem.

The mine is characterized by frass, lacks contrast, and has a greenish color.
