= Crobylophora metallifera =

Scientific classification
- Domain: Eukaryota
- Kingdom: Animalia
- Phylum: Arthropoda
- Class: Insecta
- Order: Lepidoptera
- Family: Lyonetiidae
- Genus: Crobylophora
- Species: C. metallifera

Binomial name
- Crobylophora metallifera (Walsingham, 1891)

Synonyms
- Microthauma metallifera Walsingham, 1891

Species of moth

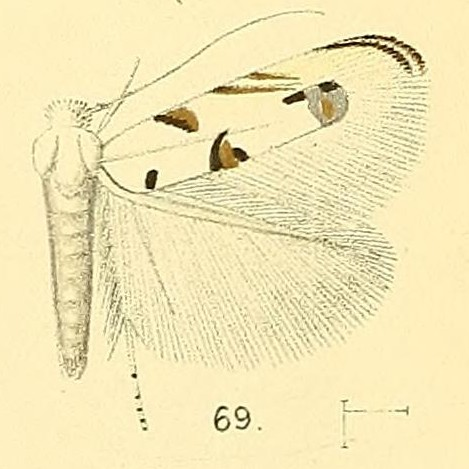
Crobylophora metallifera

Crobylophora metallifera is a moth in the family Lyonetiidae that is endemic to South Africa.
