= Leucoptera loxaula =

Scientific classification
- Kingdom: Animalia
- Phylum: Arthropoda
- Class: Insecta
- Order: Lepidoptera
- Family: Lyonetiidae
- Genus: Leucoptera
- Species: L. loxaula

Binomial name
- Leucoptera loxaula Meyrick, 1928

Species of moth

Leucoptera loxaula is a moth in the family Lyonetiidae. It is known from South Africa and Zimbabwe.

The larvae feed on Pavetta assimilis.
