= Chrysolytis deliarcha =

Scientific classification
- Kingdom: Animalia
- Phylum: Arthropoda
- Class: Insecta
- Order: Lepidoptera
- Family: Lyonetiidae
- Genus: Chrysolytis
- Species: C. deliarcha

Binomial name
- Chrysolytis deliarcha Meyrick, 1937

Species of moth

Chrysolytis deliarcha is a moth in the family Lyonetiidae. It is found in South Africa.
