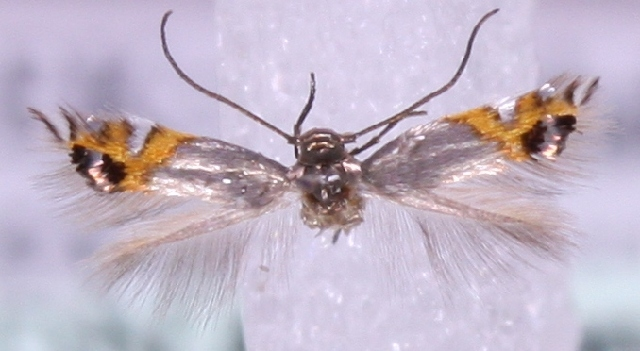

Scientific classification
- Domain: Eukaryota
- Kingdom: Animalia
- Phylum: Arthropoda
- Class: Insecta
- Order: Lepidoptera
- Family: Lyonetiidae
- Genus: Leucoptera
- Species: L. lustratella

Binomial name
- Leucoptera lustratella (Herrich-Schäffer, 1855)

Synonyms
- Cemiostoma lustratella Herrich-Schaffer, 1855

= Leucoptera lustratella =

Species of moth

Leucoptera lustratella is a moth in the Lyonetiidae family. It is found from Fennoscandia to the Pyrenees and Italy and from France to Belarus and Romania.

The larvae feed on Hypericum hirsutum, Hypericum montanum and Hypericum perforatum. They mine the leaves of their host plant.
