= Platacmaea =

Scientific classification
- Kingdom: Animalia
- Phylum: Arthropoda
- Clade: Pancrustacea
- Class: Insecta
- Order: Lepidoptera
- Family: Lyonetiidae
- Genus: Platacmaea; Meyrick, 1920

Genus of moths

Platacmaea is a genus of moths in the family Lyonetiidae.

== Species ==
- Platacmaea cretiseca Meyrick, 1920
