= Microthauma =

Scientific classification
- Domain: Eukaryota
- Kingdom: Animalia
- Phylum: Arthropoda
- Class: Insecta
- Order: Lepidoptera
- Family: Lyonetiidae
- Subfamily: Cemiostominae
- Genus: Microthauma; Walsingham, 1891

Genus of moths

Microthauma is a genus of moths in the family Lyonetiidae.

== Species ==
- Microthauma glycinella Kuroko, 1964
- Microthauma lespedezella Seksjaeva, 1990
