= Leucoptera chalocycla =

Scientific classification
- Kingdom: Animalia
- Phylum: Arthropoda
- Clade: Pancrustacea
- Class: Insecta
- Order: Lepidoptera
- Family: Lyonetiidae
- Genus: Leucoptera
- Species: L. chalocycla

Binomial name
- Leucoptera chalocycla (Meyrick, 1882)

Synonyms
- Cemiostoma chalocycla Meyrick, 1882

Species of moth

Leucoptera chalocycla is a moth in the family Lyonetiidae that is endemic to Australia.

They probably mine the leaves of their host plant.
