= Eulyonetia =

Scientific classification
- Kingdom: Animalia
- Phylum: Arthropoda
- Clade: Pancrustacea
- Class: Insecta
- Order: Lepidoptera
- Family: Lyonetiidae
- Genus: Eulyonetia; Chambers, 1880

Genus of moths

Eulyonetia is a genus of moths in the family Lyonetiidae.

== Species ==
- Eulyonetia inornatella Chambers, 1880
