= Bedellia terenodes =

Scientific classification
- Kingdom: Animalia
- Phylum: Arthropoda
- Class: Insecta
- Order: Lepidoptera
- Family: Bedelliidae
- Genus: Bedellia
- Species: B. terenodes

Binomial name
- Bedellia terenodes Meyrick, 1915

Species of moth

Bedellia terenodes is a moth in the family Bedelliidae. It is found in India.
