= Bedellia ehikella =

Scientific classification
- Domain: Eukaryota
- Kingdom: Animalia
- Phylum: Arthropoda
- Class: Insecta
- Order: Lepidoptera
- Family: Bedelliidae
- Genus: Bedellia
- Species: B. ehikella

Binomial name
- Bedellia ehikella Szöcs, 1967

Species of moth

Bedellia ehikella is a moth in the family Bedelliidae. It is found in Ukraine, Spain, Sardinia, Italy, Croatia, the Czech Republic and Hungary.

Adults are on wing from late March to mid-May and again from July to September in Ukraine.

The larvae feed on Convolvulus cantabrica. They mine the leaves of their host plant.
