= Petasobathra =

Scientific classification
- Kingdom: Animalia
- Phylum: Arthropoda
- Class: Insecta
- Order: Lepidoptera
- Family: Lyonetiidae
- Genus: Petasobathra; Meyrick, 1915

Genus of moths

Petasobathra is a genus of moths in the family Lyonetiidae.

== Species ==
- Petasobathra sirina Meyrick, 1915
- Petasobathra ishnophaea (Meyrick, 1930)
