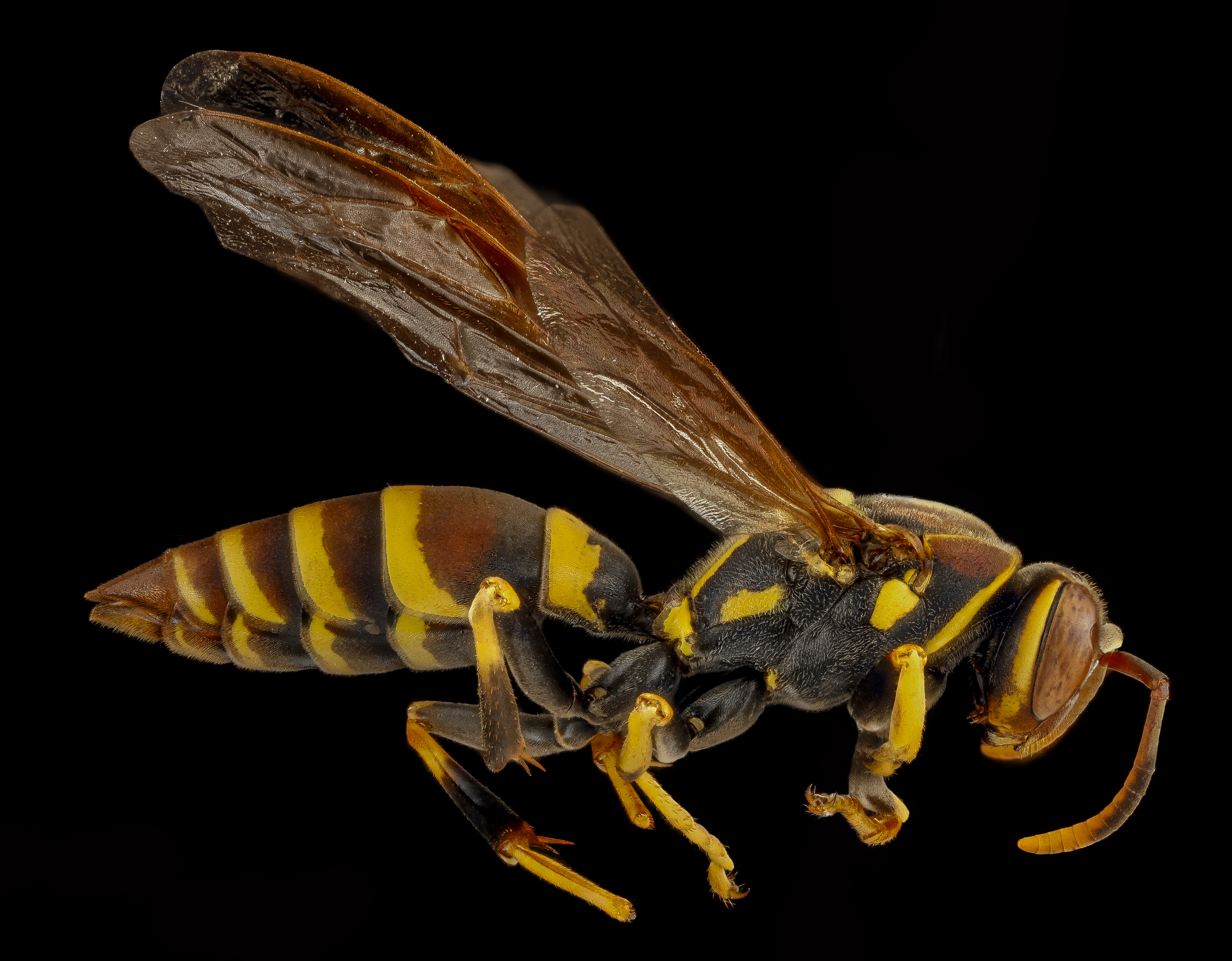

Scientific classification
- Domain: Eukaryota
- Kingdom: Animalia
- Phylum: Arthropoda
- Class: Insecta
- Order: Hymenoptera
- Family: Vespidae
- Subfamily: Polistinae
- Genus: Polistes
- Species: P. crinitus
- Subspecies: P. c. crinitus

Trinomial name
- Polistes crinitus crinitus (Felton, 1765)

= Polistes crinitus crinitus =

Subspecies of paper wasp

Polistes crinitus crinitus is a subspecies of Polistes crinitus that lives on small Caribbean islands.
