= Phyllobrostis =

Scientific classification
- Kingdom: Animalia
- Phylum: Arthropoda
- Clade: Pancrustacea
- Class: Insecta
- Order: Lepidoptera
- Family: Lyonetiidae
- Genus: Phyllobrostis; Staudinger, 1859

Synonyms
- Pilotocoma Meyrick, 1913; Phthinostoma Meyrick, 1914

Genus of moths

Phyllobrostis is a genus of moths in the family Lyonetiidae. They occur in Central and Southern Europe, North Africa, Southern Africa, and western Asia.

== Description ==
The wingspan is 6–14 mm (0.24–0.55 in), with females slightly larger than males. The larvae are leaf miners or form galls. Most species for which the host plant is known use Daphne spp., but one species uses Thymelaea microphylla.

== Species ==
There are about 11 species:

- eremitella-group
  - Phyllobrostis eremitella De Joannis, 1912
  - Phyllobrostis tephroleuca (Meyrick, 1913)
  - Phyllobrostis calcaria Meyrick, 1911
  - Phyllobrostis apathetica (Meyrick, 1921)
- daphneella-group
  - Phyllobrostis daphneella Staudinger, 1859
  - Phyllobrostis jedmella Chretien, 1907
  - Phyllobrostis hartmanni Staudinger, 1867
  - Phyllobrostis fregenella Hartig, 1940
  - Phyllobrostis farsensis Mey, 2006
  - Phyllobrostis nuristanica Mey, 2006
  - Phyllobrostis kandaharensis Mey, 2006

The status of Phyllobrostis argillosa Meyrick, 1911 is disputed. In 2006 Wolfram Mey argued that it is misplaced in Lyonetiidae and even in Yponomeutoidea and that it should probably be placed in the superfamily Tineoidea, probably in Tineidae. However, later treatments have kept recognizing Phyllobrostis argillosa as valid species in Lyonetiidae.
