= Bedellia enthrypta =

Scientific classification
- Kingdom: Animalia
- Phylum: Arthropoda
- Class: Insecta
- Order: Lepidoptera
- Family: Bedelliidae
- Genus: Bedellia
- Species: B. enthrypta

Binomial name
- Bedellia enthrypta Meyrick, 1928

Species of moth

Bedellia enthrypta is a moth in the family Bedelliidae. It is found in India.
