= Bedellia silvicolella =

Scientific classification
- Kingdom: Animalia
- Phylum: Arthropoda
- Clade: Pancrustacea
- Class: Insecta
- Order: Lepidoptera
- Family: Bedelliidae
- Genus: Bedellia
- Species: B. silvicolella

Binomial name
- Bedellia silvicolella Klimesch, 1968

Species of moth

Bedellia silvicolella is a moth in the family Bedelliidae. It is endemic to the Canary Islands.
