= Bedellia boehmeriella =

Scientific classification
- Domain: Eukaryota
- Kingdom: Animalia
- Phylum: Arthropoda
- Class: Insecta
- Order: Lepidoptera
- Family: Bedelliidae
- Genus: Bedellia
- Species: B. boehmeriella

Binomial name
- Bedellia boehmeriella Swezey, 1912

Species of moth

Bedellia boehmeriella is a moth of the family Bedelliidae. It was first described by Otto Swezey in 1912. It is endemic to the Hawaiian island of Oahu.

The larvae feed on Boehmeria grandis. They mine the leaves of their host plant. Full-grown larvae are about 6 mm long.
