= Leucoptera periphracta =

Scientific classification
- Kingdom: Animalia
- Phylum: Arthropoda
- Clade: Pancrustacea
- Class: Insecta
- Order: Lepidoptera
- Family: Lyonetiidae
- Genus: Leucoptera
- Species: L. periphracta

Binomial name
- Leucoptera periphracta Meyrick, 1915

Species of moth

Leucoptera periphracta is a moth in the family Lyonetiidae that is endemic to Australia.

They probably mine the leaves of their host plant.
