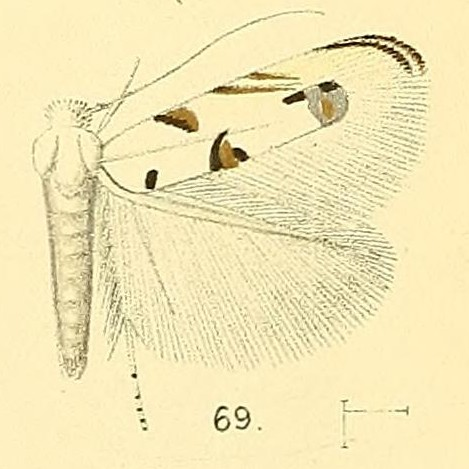
- Crobylophora metallifera

Scientific classification
- Kingdom: Animalia
- Phylum: Arthropoda
- Class: Insecta
- Order: Lepidoptera
- Family: Lyonetiidae
- Subfamily: Cemiostominae
- Genus: Crobylophora; Meyrick, 1880

Type species
- Crobylophora chrysidiella Meyrick, 1880

Synonyms
- Microthauma Walsingham, 1891

= Crobylophora =

Genus of moths

Crobylophora is a genus of moths in the family Lyonetiidae.

== Selected species ==
- Crobylophora byssinodes Meyrick, 1914 (from Malawi)
- Crobylophora chrysidiella Meyrick, 1880 (from Australia)
- Crobylophora daricella Meyrick, 1881 (from India, Malaysia, Sri Lanka, South Africa and Australia)
- Crobylophora metallifera (Walsingham, 1891) (from South Africa)
- Crobylophora methoria Ghesquière, 1940 (from Congo)
- Crobylophora onychotis Meyrick 1915 (India)
- Crobylophora psammosticta Turner, 1923 (from Australia)
- Crobylophora siglias Meyrick 1911 (India)
- Crobylophora speciosa Ghesquière, 1940 (from Congo)
- Crobylophora staterias Meyrick 1905 (India, Ceylon)
- Crobylophora xanthochyta Meyrick, 1918 (from South Africa)
