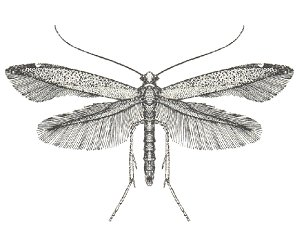
- Bedellia somnulentella

Scientific classification
- Kingdom: Animalia
- Phylum: Arthropoda
- Clade: Pancrustacea
- Class: Insecta
- Order: Lepidoptera
- Clade: Eulepidoptera
- Clade: Ditrysia
- Superfamily: Yponomeutoidea
- Family: Bedelliidae
- Genus: Bedellia; Stainton, 1849

Species
- See text

Synonyms
- Bedelliinae

= Bedellia =

Genus of moths

Bedelliidae is a small family of small, narrow-winged moths; most authorities recognize just a single genus, Bedellia, previously included in the family Lyonetiidae. The family is still included in the Lyonetiidae as the subfamily Bedelliinae by some authors.

== Species ==
Scientific name	Common name	Synonyms	Larval food plant
Bedellia boehmeriella			Boehmeria grandis
Bedellia cathareuta Meyrick, 1911			
Bedellia ehikella (Szöcs, 1967)			
Bedellia enthrypta			Porana paniculata
Bedellia ipomoella Kuroko, 1982			
Bedellia luridella Müller-Rutz, 1922			
Bedellia minor			Ipomoea
Bedellia oplismeniella			Oplismenus compositus, Panicum torridum
Bedellia orchilella			Ipomoea batatas, Solanum melongena
Bedellia psamminella			
Bedellia silvicolella Klimesch, 1968			
Bedellia somnulentella (Zeller, 1847)	Sweet potato leaf miner	Bedellia ipomoeae	Betula papyrifera, Calystegia sepium, Convolvulus, Ipomoea, Salix, Sisymbrium irio, Solanum melongena
Bedellia spectrodes Meyrick, 1931			
Bedellia struthionella			Panicum torridum
Bedellia terenodes			Ipomoea
Bedellia yasumatsui Kuroko, 1972			
