= Acanthocnemes =

Scientific classification
- Kingdom: Animalia
- Phylum: Arthropoda
- Clade: Pancrustacea
- Class: Insecta
- Order: Lepidoptera
- Family: Lyonetiidae
- Genus: Acanthocnemes; Chambers, 1878

Synonyms
- Caconome Dyar, 1903

Genus of moths

Acanthocnemes is a genus of moths in the family Lyonetiidae.

== Species ==
- Acanthocnemes fuscoscapulella Chambers, 1878
