= Leucoptera argyroptera =

Scientific classification
- Kingdom: Animalia
- Phylum: Arthropoda
- Clade: Pancrustacea
- Class: Insecta
- Order: Lepidoptera
- Family: Lyonetiidae
- Genus: Leucoptera
- Species: L. argyroptera

Binomial name
- Leucoptera argyroptera Turner, 1923

Species of moth

Leucoptera argyroptera is a moth in the family Lyonetiidae that is endemic to Australia.

They are believed to mine the leaves of their host plant.
