= Bedellia luridella =

Scientific classification
- Domain: Eukaryota
- Kingdom: Animalia
- Phylum: Arthropoda
- Class: Insecta
- Order: Lepidoptera
- Family: Bedelliidae
- Genus: Bedellia
- Species: B. luridella

Binomial name
- Bedellia luridella (Müller-Rutz, 1922)

Synonyms
- Bucculatrix luridella Müller-Rutz, 1922

Species of moth

Bedellia luridella is a moth in the family Bedelliidae. It was described by Johann Müller-Rutz in 1922. It was described from Switzerland.
