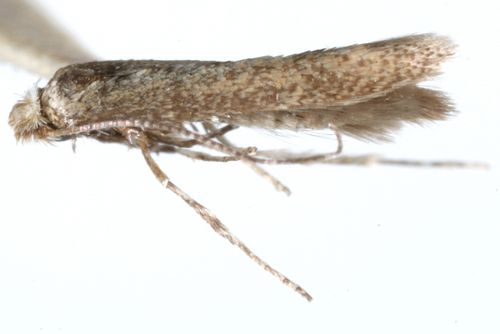

Scientific classification
- Kingdom: Animalia
- Phylum: Arthropoda
- Clade: Pancrustacea
- Class: Insecta
- Order: Lepidoptera
- Family: Bedelliidae
- Genus: Bedellia
- Species: B. minor

Binomial name
- Bedellia minor Busck, 1900

= Bedellia minor =

Species of moth

Bedellia minor, the Florida morning-glory leafminer moth, is a moth in the family Bedelliidae. It is found in Florida in the United States and on Cuba.

The larvae feed on Ipomoea species. They mine the leaves of their host plant.
