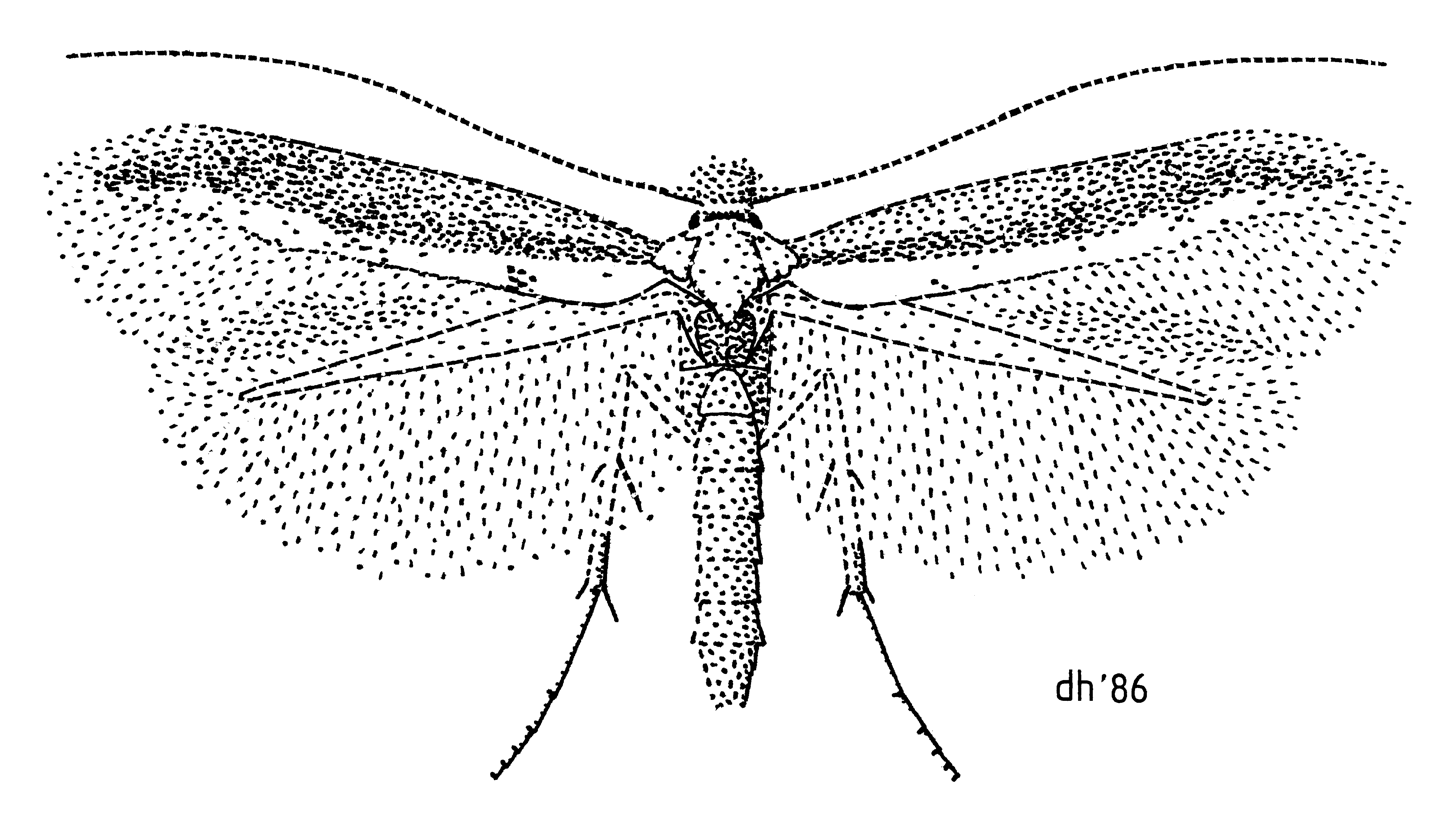

Scientific classification
- Domain: Eukaryota
- Kingdom: Animalia
- Phylum: Arthropoda
- Class: Insecta
- Order: Lepidoptera
- Family: Bedelliidae
- Genus: Bedellia
- Species: B. psamminella

Binomial name
- Bedellia psamminella Meyrick, 1889

= Bedellia psamminella =

Species of moth

Bedellia psamminella, the convolvulus skeletoniser, is a moth in the family Bedelliidae. It is found in New Zealand.

== Taxonomy ==
This species was described by Edward Meyrick in 1889.

== Host species ==
Muehlenbeckia australis is a host to the larva of this species of moth.
