= Chrysolytis =

Scientific classification
- Kingdom: Animalia
- Phylum: Arthropoda
- Class: Insecta
- Order: Lepidoptera
- Family: Lyonetiidae
- Genus: Chrysolytis; Meyrick, 1937

Genus of moths

Chrysolytis is a genus of moths in the family Lyonetiidae.

== Species ==
- Chrysolytis deliarcha Meyrick, 1937
