= Bedellia spectrodes =

Scientific classification
- Kingdom: Animalia
- Phylum: Arthropoda
- Class: Insecta
- Order: Lepidoptera
- Family: Bedelliidae
- Genus: Bedellia
- Species: B. spectrodes

Binomial name
- Bedellia spectrodes Meyrick, 1931

Species of moth

Bedellia spectrodes is a moth in the family Bedelliidae. It was described by Edward Meyrick in 1931. It is found in India.
