= Prytaneutis =

Scientific classification
- Kingdom: Animalia
- Phylum: Arthropoda
- Class: Insecta
- Order: Lepidoptera
- Family: Lyonetiidae
- Genus: Prytaneutis; Meyrick, 1911
- Species: P. clavigera

Binomial name
- Prytaneutis clavigera Meyrick, 1911

Genus of moths

Prytaneutis is a genus of moths in the family Lyonetiidae. This genus is allied to Lyonetia which, however, has the antennae always longer than the forewings.

The only species in this genus is Prytaneutis clavigera Meyrick, 1911 that is found in Sri Lanka.

It has a wingspan of 8-11mm. Its forewing are pale glossy purplish-grey, with the costal edge white and a longitudinal orange-yellow mark in disc.
