= Copobathra =

Scientific classification
- Kingdom: Animalia
- Phylum: Arthropoda
- Class: Insecta
- Order: Lepidoptera
- Family: Lyonetiidae
- Genus: Copobathra; Meyrick, 1911

Genus of moths

Copobathra is a genus of moths in the family Lyonetiidae.

== Species ==
- Copobathra menodora Meyrick, 1911
