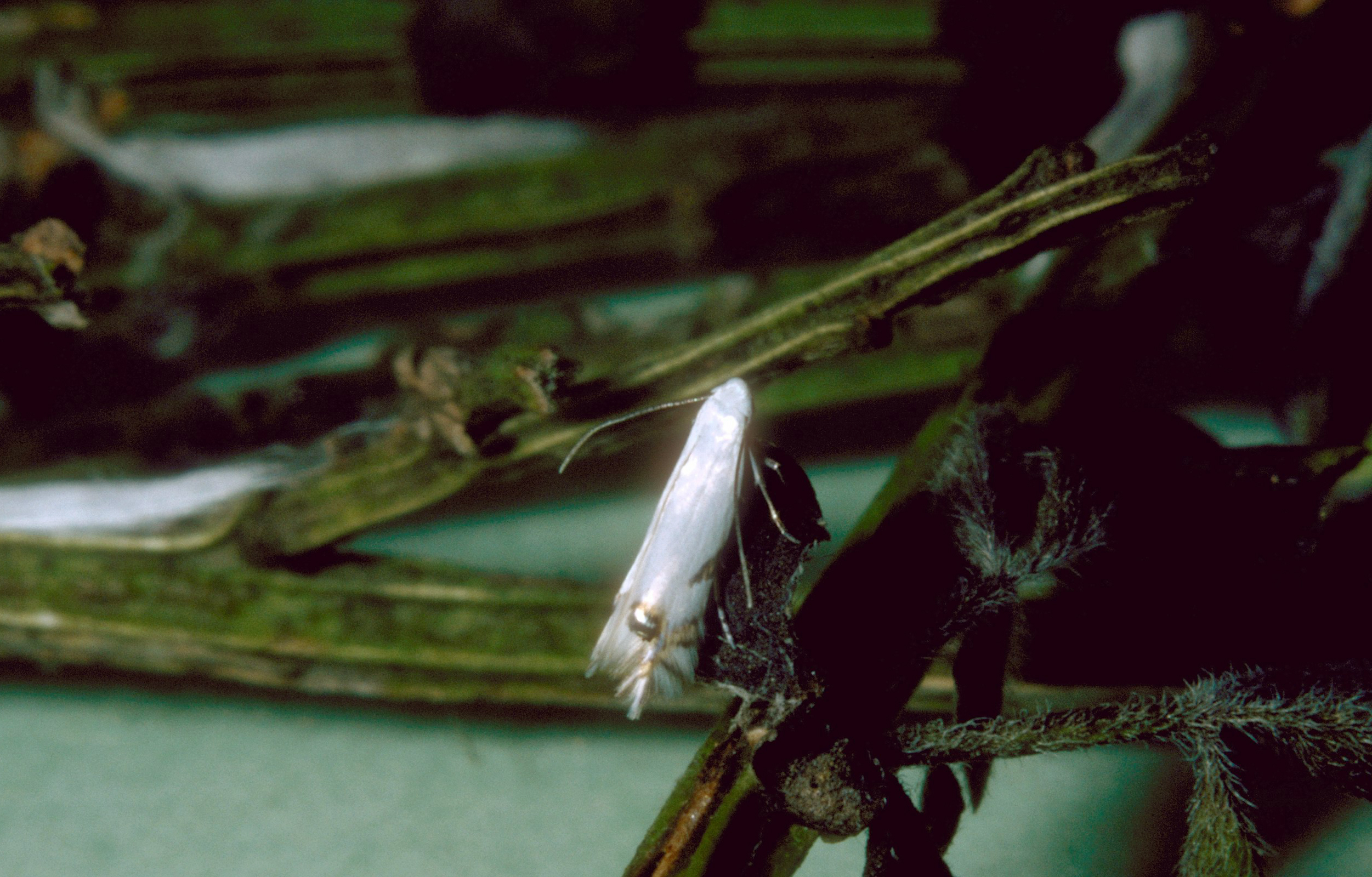
- Leucoptera spartifoliella

Scientific classification
- Kingdom: Animalia
- Phylum: Arthropoda
- Clade: Pancrustacea
- Class: Insecta
- Order: Lepidoptera
- Family: Lyonetiidae
- Subfamily: Cemiostominae
- Genus: Leucoptera; Hübner, 1825

Synonyms
- Cemiostoma Zeller, 1848; Proleucoptera Busck, 1902 (disputed); Paraleucoptera Heinrich, 1918 (disputed); Perileucoptera Silvestri, 1943

= Leucoptera (moth) =

Genus of moths

Leucoptera is a genus of moths in the family Lyonetiidae. Its members are leaf borers many of which can cause severe damage to plant crops, such as coffee or apples.

== Selected species ==
- Leucoptera aceris (Fuchs, 1903)
- Leucoptera acromelas (Turner, 1923)
- Leucoptera adenocarpella (Staudinger, 1871)
- Leucoptera andalusica Mey, 1994
- Leucoptera arethusa Meyrick, 1915
- Leucoptera argodes Turner, 1923
- Leucoptera argyroptera Turner, 1923
- Leucoptera asbolopasta Turner, 1923
- Leucoptera astragali Mey & Corley, 1999
- Leucoptera auronivea (Walker, 1875)
- Leucoptera autograpta Meyrick, 1918
- Leucoptera caffeina Washburn, 1940
- Leucoptera calycotomella Amsel, 1939
- Leucoptera chalcopleura Turner, 1923
- Leucoptera chalocycla (Meyrick, 1882)
- Leucoptera clerodendrella Vári, 1955
- Leucoptera coffeella (Guérin-Méneville, 1842)
- Leucoptera coma Ghesquière, 1940
- Leucoptera coronillae (M. Hering, 1933)
- Leucoptera crobylistis Meyrick, 1926 (India)
- Leucoptera cytisiphagella Klimesch, 1938
- Leucoptera deltidias Meyrick, 1906
- Leucoptera diasticha Turner, 1923
- Leucoptera ermolaevi Seksjaeva, 1990
- Leucoptera euryphaea Turner, 1926
- Leucoptera erythrinella Busck, 1900
- Leucoptera genistae (M. Hering, 1933)
- Leucoptera guettardella Busck, 1900
- Leucoptera hemizona Meyrick, 1906
- Leucoptera heringiella Toll, 1938
- Leucoptera hexatoma Meyrick, 1915 (India)
- Leucoptera iolitha Turner, 1923
- Leucoptera karsholti Mey, 1994
- Leucoptera laburnella (Stainton, 1851) - laburnum leaf miner
- Leucoptera lathyrifoliella (Stainton, 1866)
- Leucoptera lotella (Stainton, 1859)
- Leucoptera loxaula Meyrick, 1928
- Leucoptera lustratella (Herrich-Schäffer, 1855)
- Leucoptera malifoliella (Costa, 1836)
- Leucoptera melanolitha Turner, 1923
- Leucoptera meyricki Ghesquière, 1940
- Leucoptera nieukerkeni Mey, 1994
- Leucoptera obelacma Meyrick, 1918
- Leucoptera onobrychidella Klimesch, 1937
- Leucoptera orobi (Stainton, 1869)
- Leucoptera pachystimella Busck, 1904
- Leucoptera parinaricola Vári, 1955
- Leucoptera periphracta Meyrick, 1915
- Leucoptera phaeopasta (Turner, 1923)
- Leucoptera plagiomitra Turner, 1923
- Leucoptera psophocarpella Bradley & Carter, 1982
- Leucoptera puerariella Kuroko, 1964
- Leucoptera pulchricola Vári, 1955
- Leucoptera robinella Braun, 1925
- Leucoptera scammatias Meyrick, 1909
- Leucoptera selenocycla Meyrick, 1930
- Leucoptera sinuella (Reutti, 1853) (sometimes placed in Paraleucoptera)
- Leucoptera sortita Meyrick, 1915
- Leucoptera spartifoliella (Hübner, 1813)
- Leucoptera sphenograpta Meyrick, 1911
- Leucoptera strophidota Turner, 1923
- Leucoptera thessalica Mey, 1994
- Leucoptera toxeres Turner, 1923
- Leucoptera zanclaeella (Zeller, 1848)

=== Species placed in Paraleucoptera by some authors ===
- Leucoptera albella (V.T. Chambers, 1871) - cottonwood leaf miner
- Leucoptera heinrichi W. W. Jones, 1947

=== Species placed in Proleucoptera by some authors ===
- Leucoptera celastrella (Kuroko, 1964)
- Leucoptera oxyphyllella (Kuroko, 1964)
- Leucoptera smilactis (Kuroko, 1964)
- Leucoptera smilaciella (Busck, 1900)
