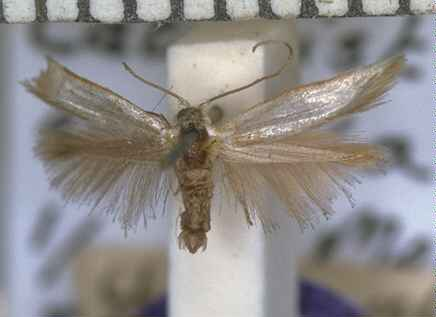

Conservation status
- Data Deficit (NZ TCS)

Scientific classification
- Kingdom: Animalia
- Phylum: Arthropoda
- Clade: Pancrustacea
- Class: Insecta
- Order: Lepidoptera
- Family: Lyonetiidae
- Subfamily: Lyonetiinae
- Genus: Cateristis; Meyrick, 1889
- Species: C. eustyla

Binomial name
- Cateristis eustyla Meyrick, 1889

= Cateristis =

Genus and species of moth, likely native to Australia

Cateristis eustyla is a species of moth in the family Tineidae. It is the only species in the genus Cateristis. This species is found in Tasmania and has been stated as being collected at Riccarton Bush in Christchurch, New Zealand. However this collection location is doubtful and this species is highly unlikely to be present in New Zealand.

== Taxonomy ==
Cateristis eustyla was first described by Edward Meyrick in 1889 using specimen he stated as being collected at Riccarton Bush in December. In 1928 George Hudson discussed the species. The collection location of this specimen is uncertain and in 2025 Robert Hoare discussed the likely absence of this species in New Zealand. The lectotype specimen is held at the Natural History Museum, London.

== Description ==
Meyrick described the species as follows:

♂. 10-11mm. Head and thorax white, face grey. Palpi dark fuscous. Antennae whitish-grey. Abdomen grey. Legs dark grey, tarsi ringed with white, middle and posterior tibiae grey-whitish. Forewings lanceolate; snow-white; costa slenderly dark fuscous from about 1/4 to 3/4 : cilia light grey, towards base whiter, round apex wholly white or ochreous-white, with a grey dot. Hindwings and cilia light grey.

== Distribution ==
This species is found in Tasmania and possibly also in Canberra. It had previously been assumed to have been present in New Zealand. However this species has not been recorded in New Zealand since 1882. Also, Meyrick, who is said to have collected specimens of this species in both Tasmania and Christchurch, is known to have lived in both Australia and New Zealand in the mid-1880s. Meyrick had previously mislabelled the collection location of specimens leading to doubt about whether the lectotype specimen for C. eustyla was actually collected at Riccarton Bush. It has been hypothesised that even if the lectotype was collected at Riccarton Bush this specimen was a result of an accidental introduction of this species into New Zealand. As a result, this species is regarded as not being present in New Zealand.

== Habitat ==
This species frequents forest habitat.

== Conservation status ==
As at 2015, this species was classified as being "Data Deficient" conservation status under the New Zealand Threat Classification System (NZTCS). However in 2025 this species was excluded from those considered under the NZTCS as scientists regarded this species as being extremely unlikely to be found in New Zealand.
