= Bedellia orchilella =

Hawaiian sweet potato leaf miner

Scientific classification
- Domain: Eukaryota
- Kingdom: Animalia
- Phylum: Arthropoda
- Class: Insecta
- Order: Lepidoptera
- Family: Bedelliidae
- Genus: Bedellia
- Species: B. orchilella

Binomial name
- Bedellia orchilella Walsingham, 1907

Species of moth

Bedellia orchilella, the Hawaiian sweet potato leaf miner, is a moth of the family Bedelliidae. It was first described by Lord Walsingham in 1907. It is endemic to the Hawaiian islands of Kauai, Oahu, Molokai, Maui and Hawaii.
