= Bedellia ipomoella =

Scientific classification
- Kingdom: Animalia
- Phylum: Arthropoda
- Class: Insecta
- Order: Lepidoptera
- Family: Bedelliidae
- Genus: Bedellia
- Species: B. ipomoella

Binomial name
- Bedellia ipomoella Kuroko, 1982

Species of moth

Bedellia ipomoella is a moth in the family Bedelliidae. It was described by Kuroko in 1982. It is found in Japan and Taiwan.
