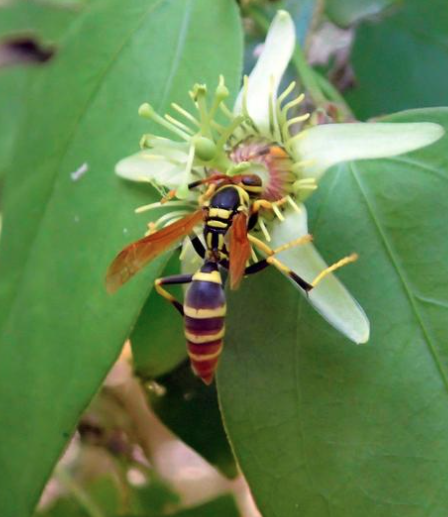

Scientific classification
- Kingdom: Animalia
- Phylum: Arthropoda
- Clade: Pancrustacea
- Class: Insecta
- Order: Hymenoptera
- Family: Vespidae
- Genus: Polistes
- Species: P. crinitus
- Subspecies: P. c. americanus

Trinomial name
- Polistes crinitus americanus (Fabricius, 1775)

= Polistes crinitus americanus =

Subspecies of paper wasp

Polistes crinitus americanus is a subspecies of Polistes crinitus that lives on small Caribbean islands.
