= Stegommata hesperias =

Scientific classification
- Kingdom: Animalia
- Phylum: Arthropoda
- Class: Insecta
- Order: Lepidoptera
- Family: Lyonetiidae
- Genus: Stegommata
- Species: S. hesperias

Binomial name
- Stegommata hesperias Meyrick, 1893

Species of moth

Stegommata hesperias is a species of moth in the genus Stegommata. It was named by Edward Meyrick in 1893. It is found in Australia, where it has been recorded from Western Australia.

The wingspan is 10–11 mm. The forewings are snow-white with four pale brownish-ochreous oblique streaks from the posterior half of the costa, reaching about half across the wing, the fourth little oblique. There is a series of cloudy indistinct pale brownish-ochreous spots along the inner and hind margin, not reaching half across the wing. There is also a round black apical dot. The hindwings are grey.
