= Leucoptera lotella =

Scientific classification
- Kingdom: Animalia
- Phylum: Arthropoda
- Clade: Pancrustacea
- Class: Insecta
- Order: Lepidoptera
- Family: Lyonetiidae
- Genus: Leucoptera
- Species: L. lotella

Binomial name
- Leucoptera lotella (Stainton, 1859)

Synonyms
- Cemiostoma lotella Stainton, 1859

Species of moth

Leucoptera lotella is a moth in the Lyonetiidae family. It is found from Denmark to Portugal, Italy and Croatia, and from Great Britain to Poland and Hungary. External image The wingspan is 5–6 mm. The forewings are light shining metallic grey; apical half beyond an oblique line orange, enclosing two white dark -edged costal spots, and a post-tornal pale golden spot partly black-edged anteriorly and followed by a coppery black apical spot; a black vertical bar in cilia at apex, a bar before and two diverging bars beyond it, penultimate directed upwards. Hindwings are rather dark grey. The larva is yellow-whitish; head and plate of 2 pale brown

The larvae feed on Securigera varia, Dorycnium pentaphyllum, Lotus corniculatus, Lotus pedunculatus, Securigera coronata and Lotus maritimus. They mine the leaves of their host plant. The mine consists of an upper-surface blotch without a preceding gallery. The blotch is nearly circular, but may have broad lobes. The black frass is deposited in indistinct arcs or spirals, glued to the upper epidermis and forming a dark central patch. The larvae may leave a mined leaf and restart elsewhere. Pupation takes place outside of the mine.
