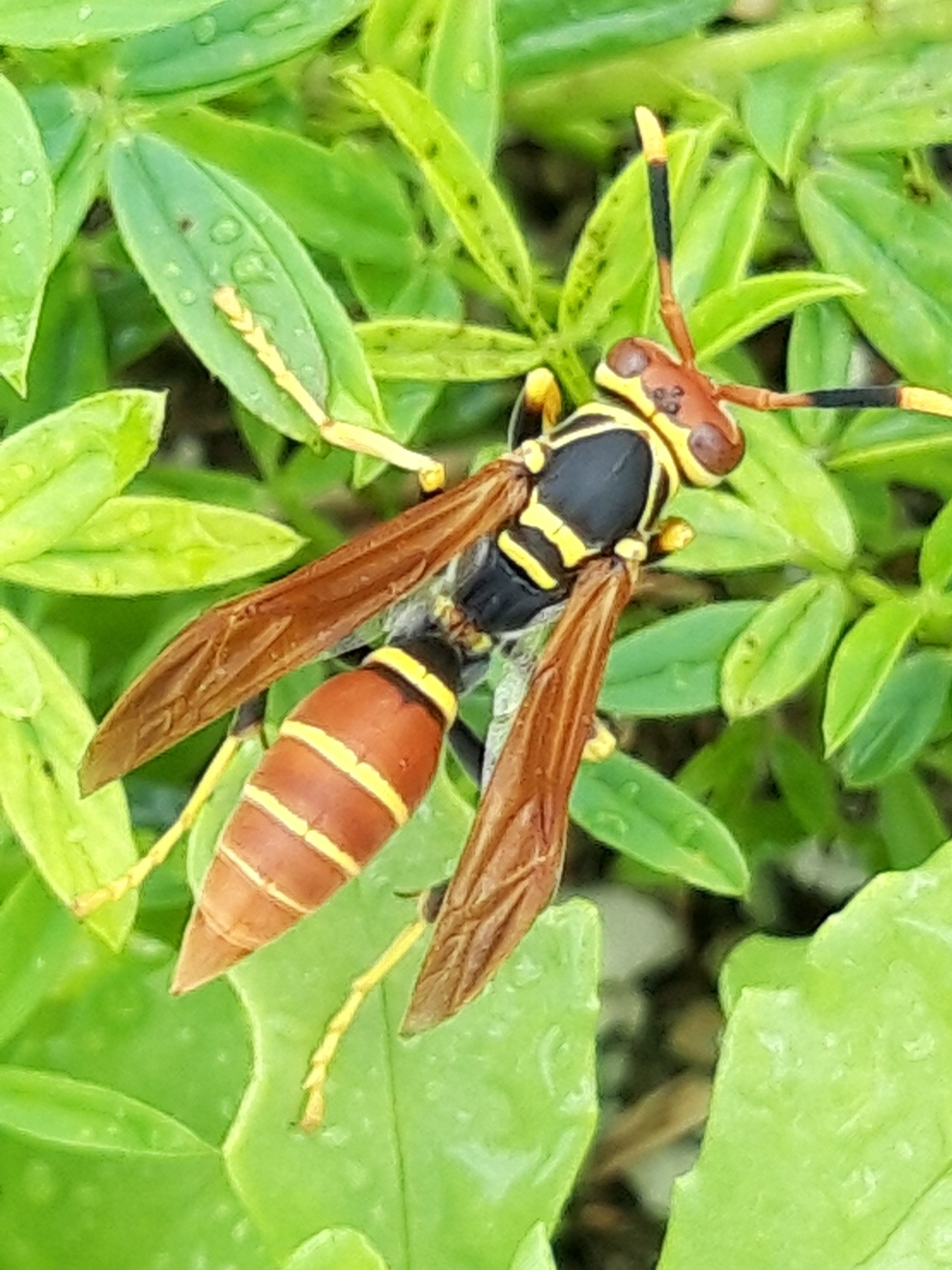

Scientific classification
- Domain: Eukaryota
- Kingdom: Animalia
- Phylum: Arthropoda
- Class: Insecta
- Order: Hymenoptera
- Family: Vespidae
- Subfamily: Polistinae
- Genus: Polistes
- Species: P. crinitus
- Subspecies: P. c. multicolor

Trinomial name
- Polistes crinitus multicolor (Olivier, 1792)

= Polistes crinitus multicolor =

Subspecies of paper wasp

Polistes crinitus multicolor is a subspecies of Polistes crinitus that lives on small Caribbean islands.
