= Stegommata =

Scientific classification
- Kingdom: Animalia
- Phylum: Arthropoda
- Class: Insecta
- Order: Lepidoptera
- Family: Lyonetiidae
- Genus: Stegommata; Meyrick, 1880

Genus of moths

Stegommata is a genus of moths in the family Lyonetiidae.

== Species ==
- Stegommata hesperias Meyrick, 1893
- Stegommata leptomitella Meyrick, 1880
- Stegommata sulfuratella Meyrick, 1880
