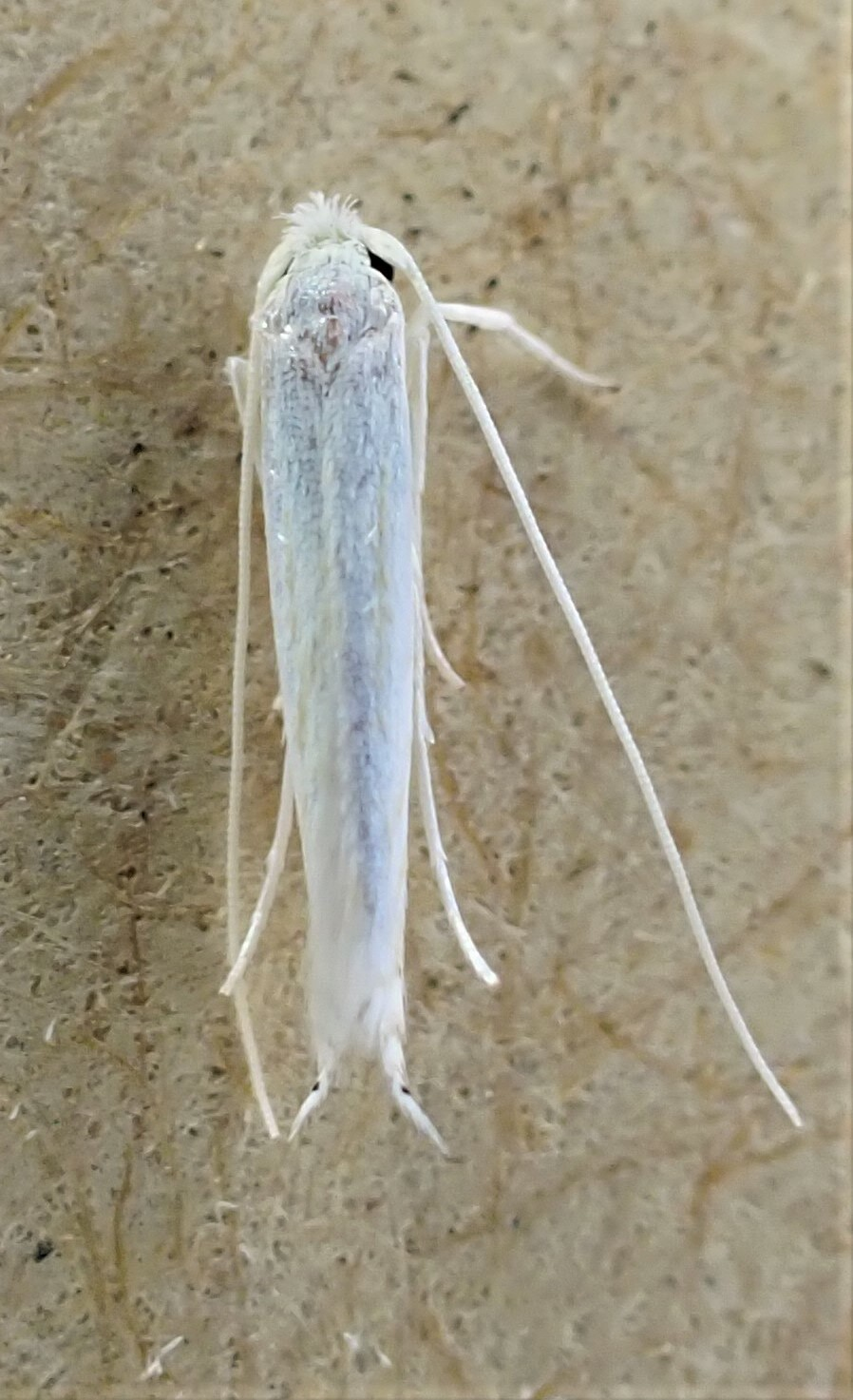
- Stegommata sulfuratella, New Zealand

Scientific classification
- Kingdom: Animalia
- Phylum: Arthropoda
- Class: Insecta
- Order: Lepidoptera
- Family: Lyonetiidae
- Genus: Stegommata
- Species: S. sulfuratella

Binomial name
- Stegommata sulfuratella Meyrick, 1880

= Stegommata sulfuratella =

Species of moth

Stegommata sulfuratella, the banksia leaf-miner, is a species of moth in the family Lyonetiidae. It is native to Australia, where it has been recorded from Queensland to Tasmania. It is an adventive species in New Zealand.

The wingspan is about 15 mm. Adults are white, with some darker markings on the forewings.

The larvae mine the leaves of various Banksia species, including Banksia integrifolia and Banksia serrata.
