= Stegommata leptomitella =

Hakea leaf-miner

Scientific classification
- Kingdom: Animalia
- Phylum: Arthropoda
- Class: Insecta
- Order: Lepidoptera
- Family: Lyonetiidae
- Genus: Stegommata
- Species: S. leptomitella

Binomial name
- Stegommata leptomitella Meyrick, 1880

Species of moth

Stegommata leptomitella, the hakea leaf-miner is a species of moth in the Lyonetiidae family. It was described by Edward Meyrick in 1880. It is found in Australia, where it has been recorded from Queensland, New South Wales and Victoria. It is also present in New Zealand, where it is an established adventive.

The wingspan is about 8 mm. Adults are fawn.
