= Leucoedemia =

Scientific classification
- Kingdom: Animalia
- Phylum: Arthropoda
- Clade: Pancrustacea
- Class: Insecta
- Order: Lepidoptera
- Family: Lyonetiidae
- Genus: Leucoedemia; Scoble & Scholtz, 1984

Genus of moths

Leucoedemia is a genus of moths in the family Lyonetiidae.

== Species ==
- Leucoedemia ingens Scoble & Scholtz, 1984
