= Bedellia cathareuta =

Scientific classification
- Kingdom: Animalia
- Phylum: Arthropoda
- Class: Insecta
- Order: Lepidoptera
- Family: Bedelliidae
- Genus: Bedellia
- Species: B. cathareuta

Binomial name
- Bedellia cathareuta Meyrick, 1911

Species of moth

Bedellia cathareuta is a moth of the family Bedelliidae. It is known from South Africa.
