= Exegetia =

Scientific classification
- Kingdom: Animalia
- Phylum: Arthropoda
- Class: Insecta
- Order: Lepidoptera
- Family: Lyonetiidae
- Genus: Exegetia; Braun, 1918

Genus of moths

Exegetia is a genus of moths in the family Lyonetiidae.

== Species ==
- Exegetia crocea Braun, 1918
