= Leucoptera phaeopasta =

Scientific classification
- Kingdom: Animalia
- Phylum: Arthropoda
- Clade: Pancrustacea
- Class: Insecta
- Order: Lepidoptera
- Family: Lyonetiidae
- Genus: Leucoptera
- Species: L. phaeopasta

Binomial name
- Leucoptera phaeopasta (Turner, 1923)

Synonyms
- Opostega phaeopasta Turner, 1923

Species of moth

Leucoptera phaeopasta is a moth in the family Lyonetiidae that is known from Australia and was described from Queensland.

They probably mine the leaves of their host plant.
