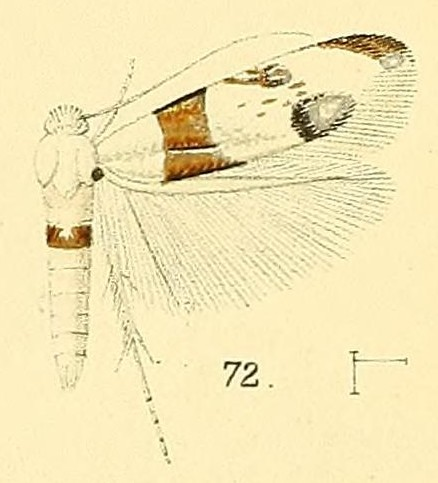
- Micropostega aeneofasciata

Scientific classification
- Kingdom: Animalia
- Phylum: Arthropoda
- Class: Insecta
- Order: Lepidoptera
- Family: Lyonetiidae
- Genus: Micropostega; Walsingham, 1891

= Micropostega =

Genus of moths

Micropostega is a genus of moths in the family Lyonetiidae.

== Selected species ==
- Micropostega aeneofasciata Walsingham, 1891
