= Crobylophora daricella =

Scientific classification
- Kingdom: Animalia
- Phylum: Arthropoda
- Class: Insecta
- Order: Lepidoptera
- Family: Lyonetiidae
- Genus: Crobylophora
- Species: C. daricella

Binomial name
- Crobylophora daricella Meyrick, 1881

Synonyms
- Leucoptera daricella

Species of moth

Crobylophora daricella is a moth in the family Lyonetiidae.

== Distribution ==
It has been recorded from India, Malaysia, Sri Lanka, South Africa and Australia.

The larvae feed on Plumbago auriculata.
