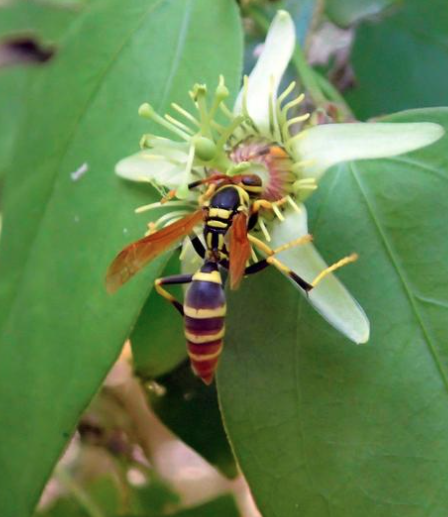
- P. crinitus in Puerto Rico

Scientific classification
- Kingdom: Animalia
- Phylum: Arthropoda
- Clade: Pancrustacea
- Class: Insecta
- Order: Hymenoptera
- Family: Vespidae
- Subfamily: Polistinae
- Tribe: Polistini
- Genus: Polistes
- Species: P. crinitus

Binomial name
- Polistes crinitus (Felton, 1765)

Synonyms
- Polistes media Pal. de Beauv., 1818; Vespa tricolor Fabricius, 1775

= Polistes crinitus =

Species of wasp

Polistes crinitus is a species of paper wasp most commonly found on Hispaniola, Jamaica and other, smaller Caribbean islands. Subspecies of P. crinitus include Polistes crinitus crinitus, Polistes crinitus americanus, and Polistes crinitus multicolor.
