= Bedellia yasumatsui =

Scientific classification
- Kingdom: Animalia
- Phylum: Arthropoda
- Class: Insecta
- Order: Lepidoptera
- Family: Bedelliidae
- Genus: Bedellia
- Species: B. yasumatsui

Binomial name
- Bedellia yasumatsui Kuroko, 1972

Species of moth

Bedellia yasumatsui is a moth in the Bedelliidae family. It is known from Australia and Papua New Guinea.

The larvae have been recorded on Ipomoea species. They mine the leaves of their host plant.
