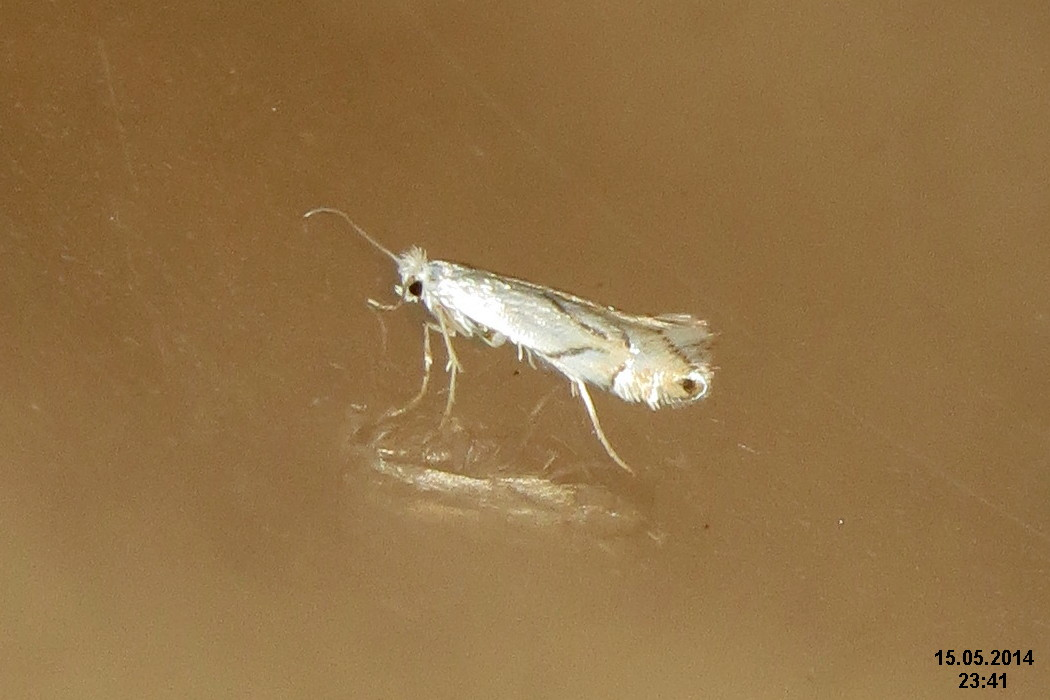

Scientific classification
- Kingdom: Animalia
- Phylum: Arthropoda
- Clade: Pancrustacea
- Class: Insecta
- Order: Lepidoptera
- Family: Lyonetiidae
- Genus: Leucoptera
- Species: L. laburnella

Binomial name
- Leucoptera laburnella (Stainton, 1851)

Synonyms
- Cemiostoma laburnella Stainton, 1851; Cemiostoma wailesella Stainton, 1858; Leucoptera wailesella

= Leucoptera laburnella =

Species of moth

Leucoptera laburnella (laburnum leaf miner) is a moth in the family Lyonetiidae. It is found in most of Europe, except the European part of Russia and the southern part of the Balkan Peninsula. It is also found in North America.

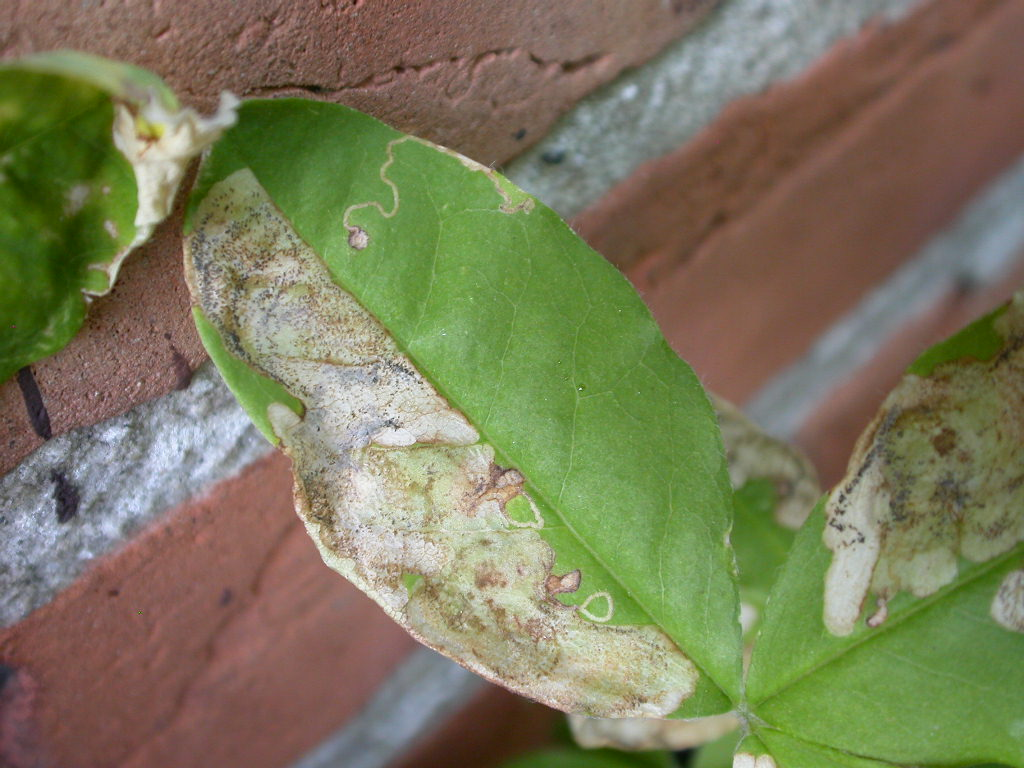
Mine

== Description ==
The forewings are white; an oblique ochreous-yellow bar from costa beyond middle, edged with dark fuscous; a nearly vertical ochreous-yellow costal spot before apex, edged with dark fuscous parallel lines; beneath this a pale violet -golden -metallic post-tornal spot, edged on sides with black and above with yellowish; apex yellowish; three diverging dark fuscous bars in apical cilia. Hindwings are whitish. The larva is green-whitish.

== Biology ==
The larvae feed on Astragalus, Chamaecytisus supinus, Genista tinctoria, Laburnocytisus adamii, Laburnum alpinum, Laburnum anagyroides, Lupinus polyphyllus and Petteria ramentacea (Fabaceae). They mine the leaves of their host plant.
