= Panicum torridum =

Scientific classification
- Kingdom: Plantae
- Clade: Tracheophytes
- Clade: Angiosperms
- Clade: Monocots
- Clade: Commelinids
- Order: Poales
- Family: Poaceae
- Subfamily: Panicoideae
- Genus: Panicum
- Species: P. torridum

Binomial name
- Panicum torridum Gaudich.

Species of grass

Panicum torridum (torrid panicgrass or Hawaiian: kākonakona) is a species of panicgrass in the family Poaceae found in the Hawaiian Islands.
