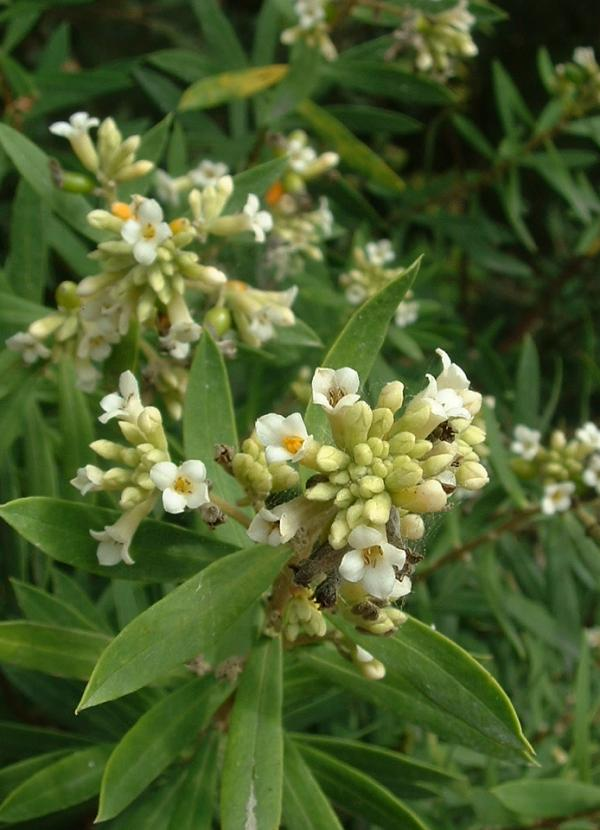

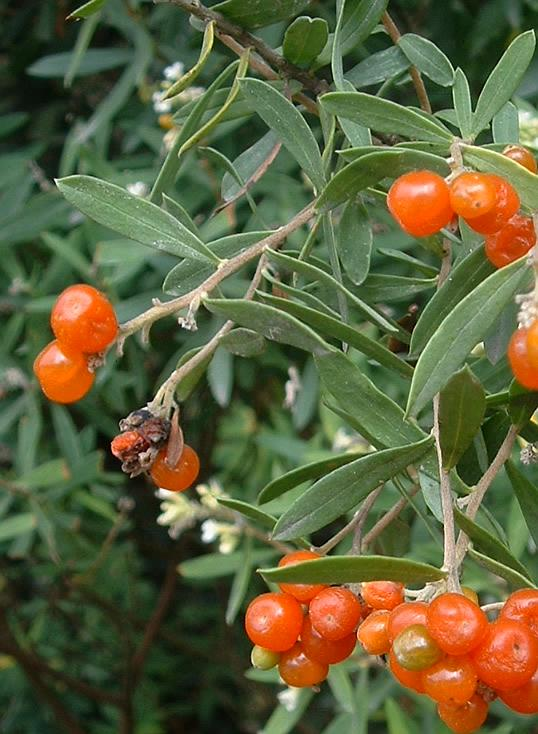
- Unripe fruit (drupes)

Scientific classification
- Kingdom: Plantae
- Clade: Embryophytes
- Clade: Tracheophytes
- Clade: Spermatophytes
- Clade: Angiosperms
- Clade: Eudicots
- Clade: Rosids
- Order: Malvales
- Family: Thymelaeaceae
- Genus: Daphne
- Species: D. gnidium

Binomial name
- Daphne gnidium L.

= Daphne gnidium =

Flax-leaved daphne

Species of flowering plant

Daphne gnidium, the flax-leaved daphne, is a poisonous evergreen shrub from the northern and western Mediterranean region, with narrow, dense dark-green foliage and white fragrant flowers.

== Description ==
Daphne gnidium is a shrub with upright branches that grow to 1.5 to 2 m (4 ft 11 in to 6 ft 7 in) tall. The dense lanceolate leaves are dark green with sticky undersides. It bears fragrant white flowers in late spring or early summer. The fruit is a drupe, and is round and red, about 8 mm (0.31 in) diameter. They are produced during autumn.

== Taxonomy ==
Three subspecies are currently accepted by the Plants of the World Online database:

- Daphne gnidium subsp. gnidium – Europe, coastal northwest Africa, Canary Islands
- Daphne gnidium subsp. maritima (Rozeira) Capelo, J.C.Costa, Esp.Santo & Lousã – western Portugal
- Daphne gnidium subsp. mauritanica (Nieto Fel.) Halda – northwest Africa in the Atlas Mountains

Recent genetic analysis however suggests that the Atlas Mountains populations are strongly distinct, and would be better treated as a separate species Daphne mauritanica Nieto Fel., but conversely, that the western Portuguese population is not distinct from the rest of the European populations, so subsp. maritima should be regarded as a synonym of subsp. gnidium.

== Habitat ==
Daphne gnidium grows well in sandy loam. It grows in fields, woodlands, garrigues, and hillsides, and is native to the areas surrounding the north and west of the Mediterranean Sea in southern Europe from Portugal east to Greece, and northwestern Africa in Morocco, Algeria, and Tunisia.

== Toxicity ==
Daphne gnidium contains the toxins mezerein and daphnetoxin. All parts of the plant are considered highly poisonous. Skin contact with the sap can cause dermatitis The chance of death is small yet possible within 6 hours after direct consumption. At least severe anabolic and indigestive reactions are expected, which may also trigger lethal allergic reactions.
