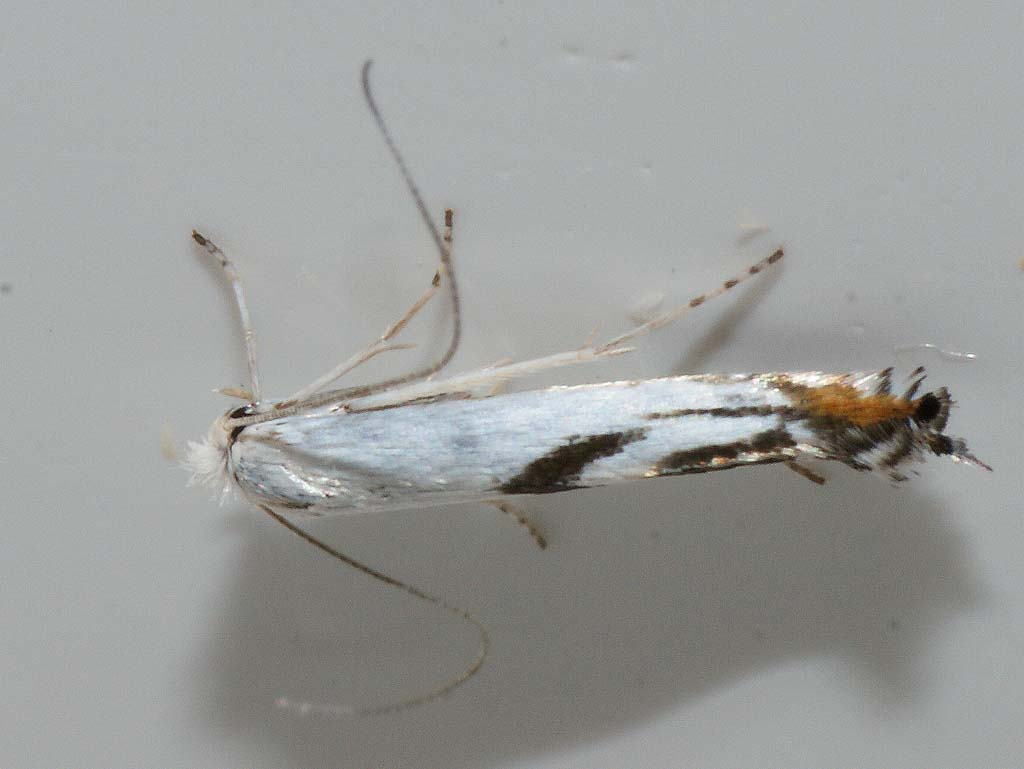
- Lyonetia prunifoliella imago
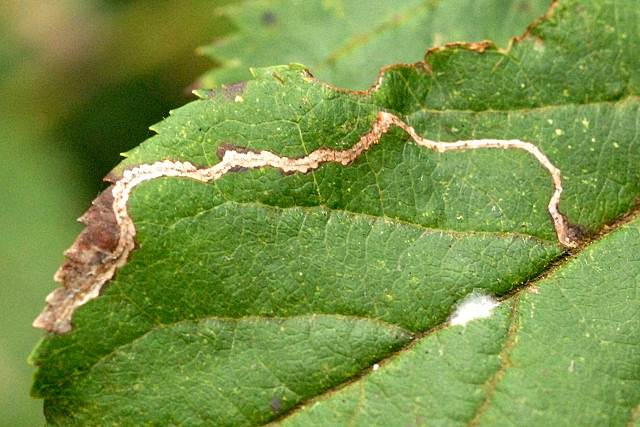
- Mines of Lyonetia clerkella

Scientific classification
- Kingdom: Animalia
- Phylum: Arthropoda
- Clade: Pancrustacea
- Class: Insecta
- Order: Lepidoptera
- Superfamily: Yponomeutoidea
- Family: Lyonetiidae; Stainton, 1854

Genera
- See text

= Lyonetiidae =

Family of moths

Lyonetiidae is a family of moths with around 200 described species. These are small, slender moths, the wingspan rarely exceeding 1 cm. The very narrow forewings, held folded backwards covering the hindwings and abdomen, often have pointed apices noticeably up- or down-turned. The larvae are leaf miners.

The families Bucculatricidae and Bedelliidae are sometimes considered subfamilies of Lyonetiidae.

== Genera ==
- Acanthocnemes
- Arctocoma
- Atalopsycha
- Busckia
- Cateristis
- Chrysolytis
- Cladarodes
- Compsoschema
- Copobathra
- Crobylophora
- Cycloponympha
- Daulocoma
- Diplothectis
- Erioptris
- Eulyonetia
- Exegetia
- Hierocrobyla
- Leioprora
- Leucoedemia
- Leucoptera
- Lyonetia
- Micropostega
- Microthauma
- Orochion
- Otoptris
- Petasobathra
- Phyllobrostis
- Platacmaea
- †Prolyonetia
- Prytaneutis
- Stegommata
- Taeniodictys
