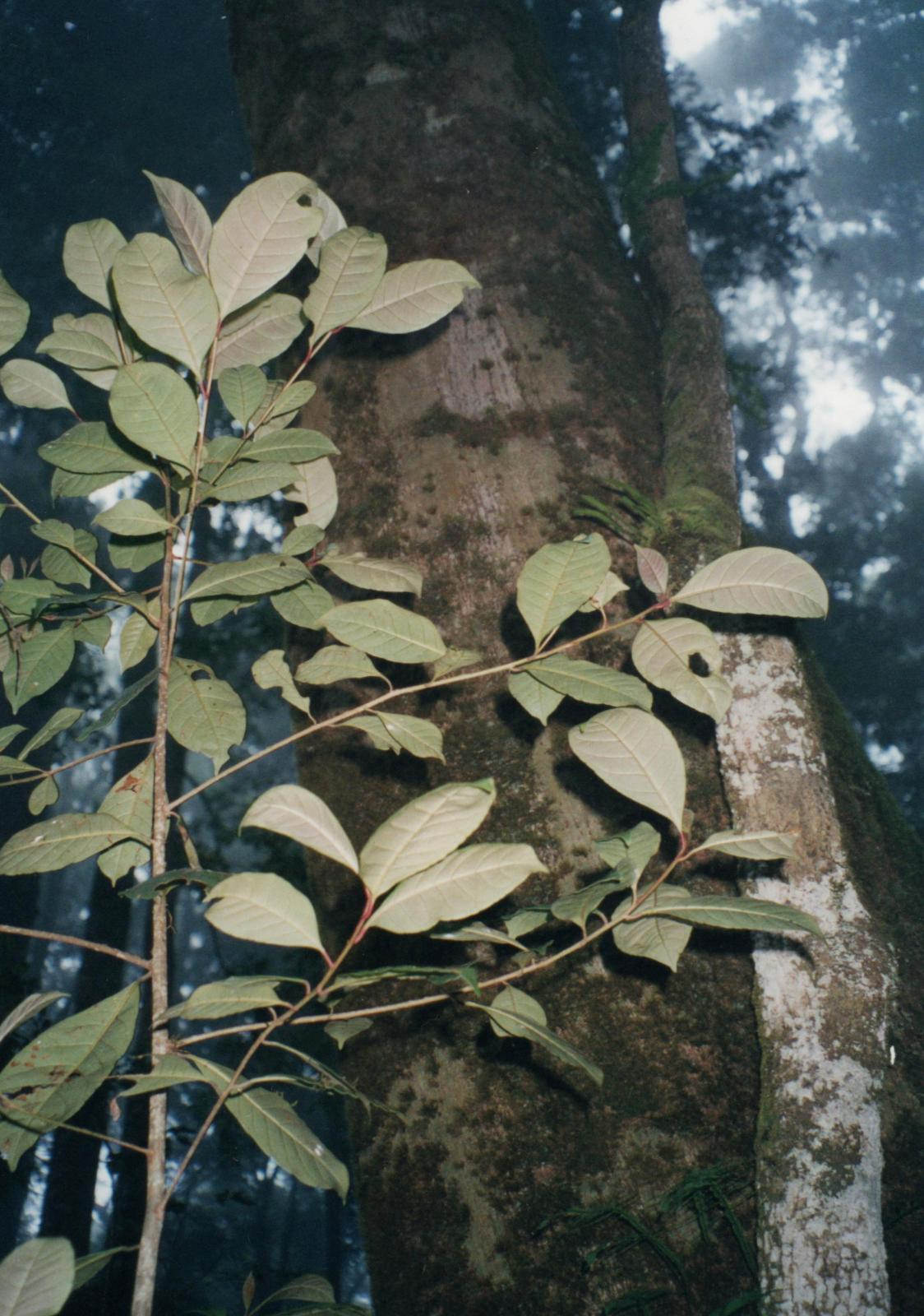
- Young tree at Mount Banda Banda, Australia
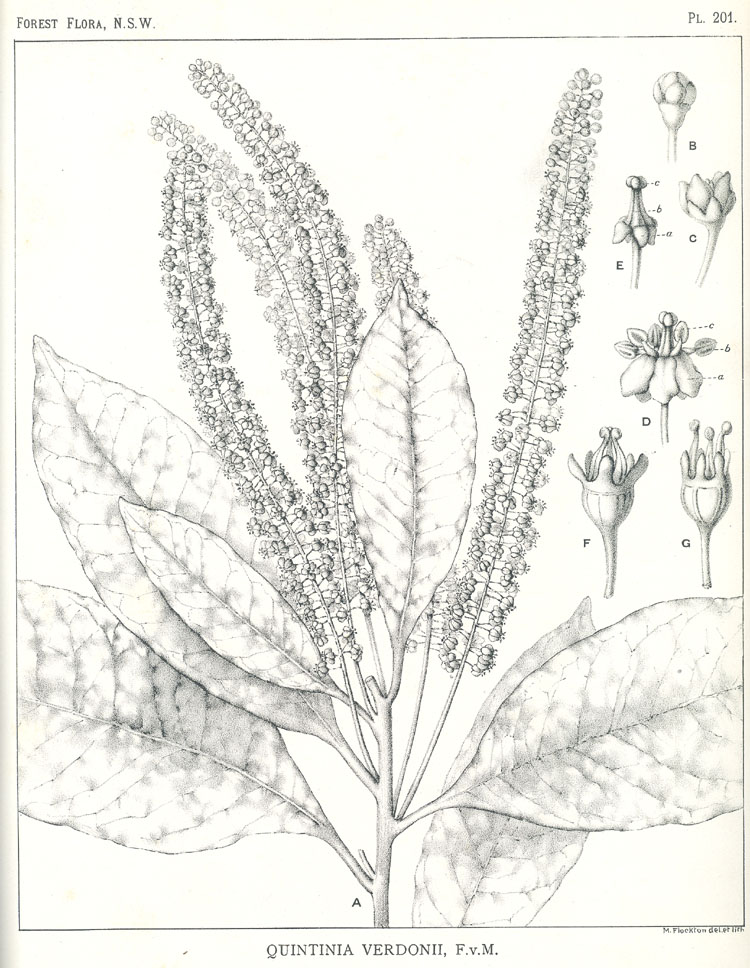
- Drawing by Margaret Flockton

Scientific classification
- Kingdom: Plantae
- Clade: Tracheophytes
- Clade: Angiosperms
- Clade: Eudicots
- Clade: Asterids
- Order: Paracryphiales
- Family: Paracryphiaceae
- Genus: Quintinia
- Species: Q. verdonii

Binomial name
- Quintinia verdonii F.Muell.

= Quintinia verdonii =

Grey possumwood

Species of tree

Quintinia verdonii, commonly known as the grey possumwood, is a tree of eastern Australia. It is mostly found in rainforests at high altitude. The range of natural distribution is between the Barrington Tops region of New South Wales and the Blackall Range in the state of Queensland.

== Description ==
The grey possumwood is a small to medium-sized tree to 17 metres (56 ft) tall and a stem diameter of 30 centimetres (12 in). It may be distinguished from the related possumwood (Quintinia sieberi) by the smoother bark and the branchlets being paler. The possumwood has minute reddish glands under the leaf where the grey possumwood has clear glands. The flowers of the possumwood are in panicles, where the grey possumwood has flowers on racemes.

=== Trunk and branchlets ===
The trunk is mostly straight and cylindrical. The bark is smooth, pale grey and somewhat soft and corky. Small branches are fairly thick, and smooth. Branchlets have scars of fallen leaves, and the ends are the branchlets are purple or dark red.

=== Leaves ===
The leaves are alternately arranged along the stem, oval-elliptical to elliptical with a short blunt tip. The hairless and leathery leaves are 5–15 centimetres (2–6 in) long, 1.5–5 centimetres (5/8–2 in) wide on mature foliage. The upper surface is dark green, underneath a paler green. The underside of the leaves has tiny colourless glands. The 1–2-centimetre-long (1/2–3/4 in) leaf stalks are twisted.

The lateral leaf veins are raised and conspicuous on the underside, and less conspicuous above. The veins are usually 12 to 20 in number, with an angle of 75 degrees to the midrib. Veins are mostly straight, though curved where meeting the leaf margin. The reticulate net veins are barely noticeable on the upper side. Coppice leaves may be faintly toothed. The mature leaves are entire, not toothed.

=== Flowers ===
White, cream or yellow coloured five-petalled flowers form in the upper axils on a single narrow raceme from the months of September to November. The raceme stalk is around 3 to 4 mm in length. Petals are 2 to 3 mm long. The fruit capsule is small, hemispherical in shape, ripening from December to January.

== Germination ==
Wind blown seeds often germinate in the form of a hemiepiphyte on the trunks of rocks and tree ferns such as Dicksonia antarctica. As the roots of the germinating seeds are so small, care needs to be given to provide adequate moisture and protection from being buried or exposed. Due to the small size, seed regeneration requires a satisfactory substrate. It is advised to lightly cover the seeds with a seed raising potting mix. Regeneration from seeds and cuttings is not difficult.

== Timber & cultivation ==
The soft pink timber has no particular commercial use. However, the prominent flowering display gives this plant horticultural potential. Over a hundred years ago, Joseph Maiden suggested it is well suited to gardens on the Australian east coast. However, predictions of widespread horticultural plantings have not eventuated. It grows readily in soils with good drainage that retain moisture in sunny or sheltered positions. Quintinia verdonii tolerates moderate frosts.

== Taxonomy and naming ==
The specific epithet honours the politician George Frederic Verdon. The plant was described by Ferdinand Mueller in 1861, from specimens collected by Hermann Beckler at the Manning and Hasting Rivers. It is sometimes referred as the smooth possumwood due to the bark, which contrasts to the rougher bark of the related possumwood.

== Ecology ==
Quintinia verdonii is host to the leaf miner moth Lyonetia lechrioscia.
