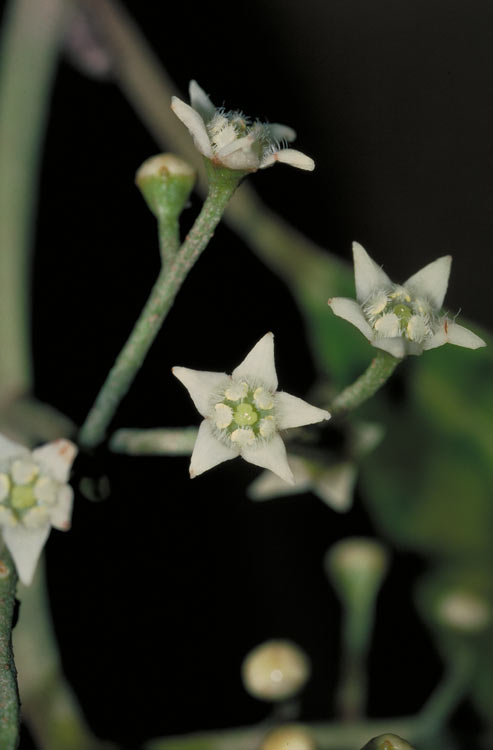
- Flowers

Conservation status
- Least Concern (IUCN 3.1)

Scientific classification
- Kingdom: Plantae
- Clade: Tracheophytes
- Clade: Angiosperms
- Clade: Eudicots
- Clade: Asterids
- Order: Paracryphiales
- Family: Paracryphiaceae
- Genus: Quintinia
- Species: Q. quatrefagesii

Binomial name
- Quintinia quatrefagesii F.Muell.

= Quintinia quatrefagesii =

Species of flowering plant

Quintinia quatrefagesii is a species of plant in the family Paracryphiaceae. It is endemic to the tropical coast of Queensland, Australia, growing in upland rainforest from near Mossman to about Innisfail, as well as a disjunct population to the west of Mackay.

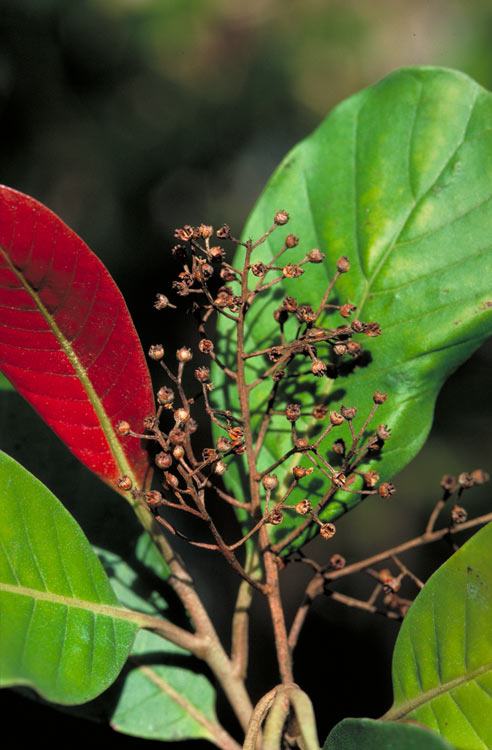
Fruit and foliage

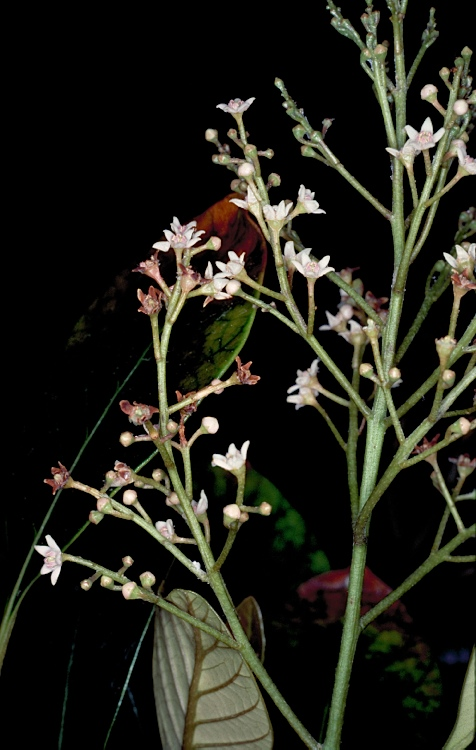
Inflorescence

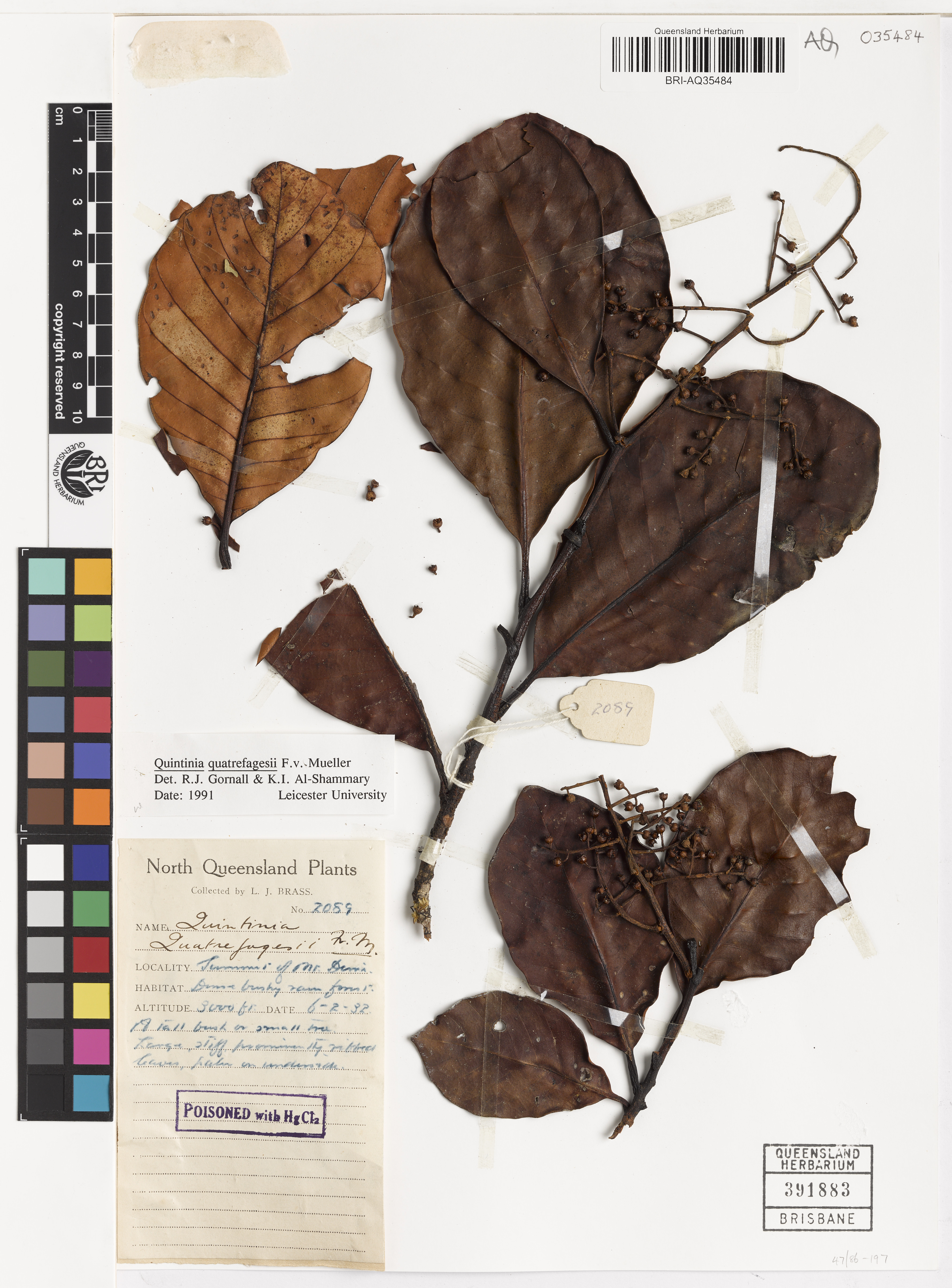
Herbarium specimen
