= Quintinia elliptica =

Scientific classification
- Kingdom: Plantae
- Clade: Tracheophytes
- Clade: Angiosperms
- Clade: Eudicots
- Clade: Asterids
- Order: Paracryphiales
- Family: Paracryphiaceae
- Genus: Quintinia
- Species: Q. elliptica

Binomial name
- Quintinia elliptica Hook.f.

Synonyms
- Quintinia serrata var. elliptica (Hook.f.) Kirk

Species of flowering plant

Quintinia elliptica is a species of plant in the family Paracryphiaceae. It is endemic to the North Island of New Zealand.
