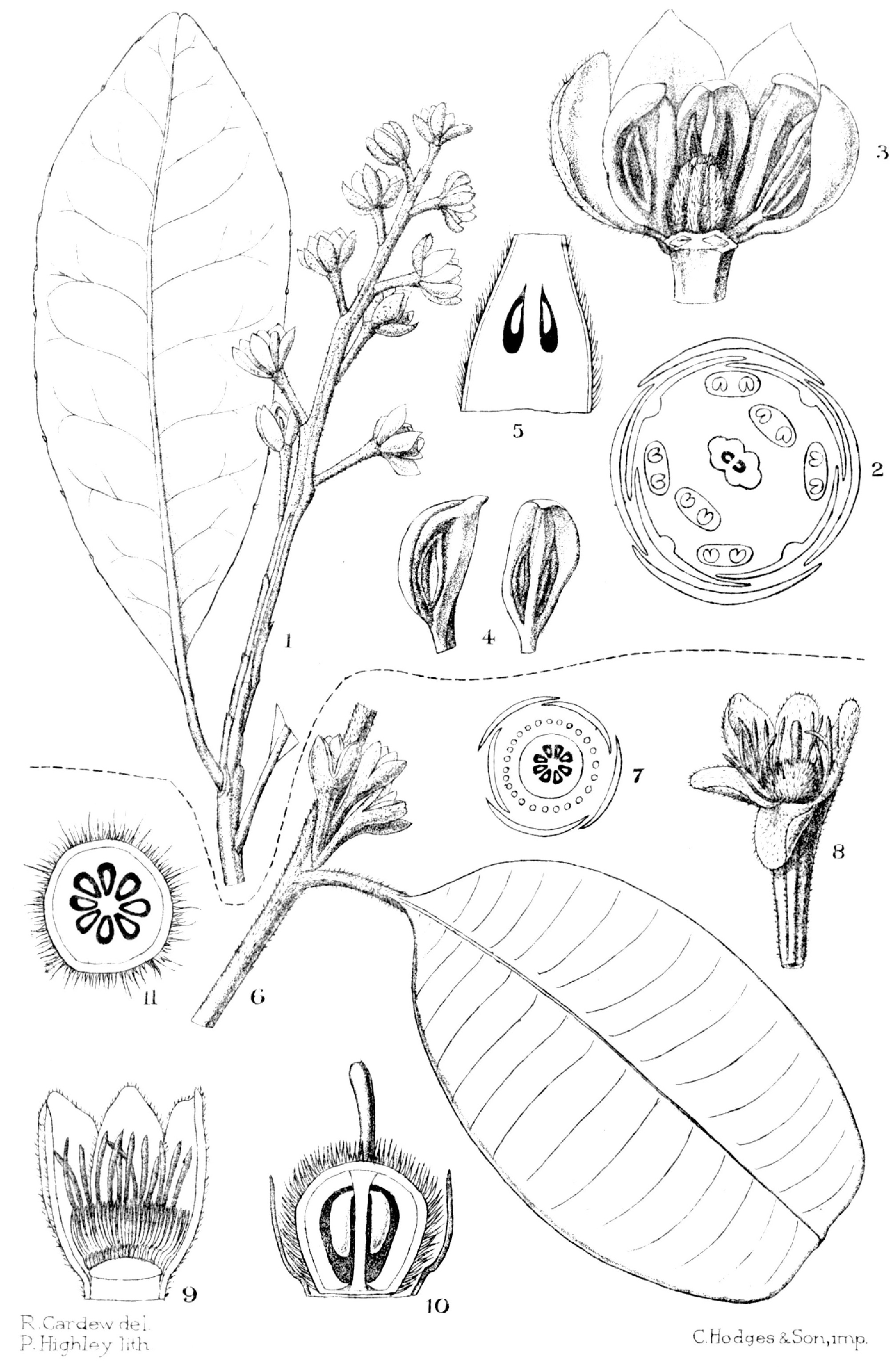
- Sphenostemon comptonii

Scientific classification
- Kingdom: Plantae
- Clade: Tracheophytes
- Clade: Angiosperms
- Clade: Eudicots
- Clade: Asterids
- Order: Paracryphiales
- Family: Paracryphiaceae
- Genus: Sphenostemon; Baill.

Species
- See text

= Sphenostemon =

Genus of small evergreen trees and shrubs

Sphenostemon is a genus of small evergreen trees or shrubs native to New Guinea, Queensland (Australia) and New Caledonia. They have opposite or spiral leaves, and at most small stipules. The small flowers, borne in terminal inflorescences, have free (i.e. unjoined) sepals and petals. The anthers have thick filaments. The fruit, a berry, is fleshy and contains two seeds. The genus is described as "particularly poorly known".

== Taxonomy ==
Sphenostemon was erected in 1875 by Henri Ernest Baillon to accommodate two New Caledonian species he had described, S. balansae and S. pachycladum [sic]. Historically the genus has proven to be difficult to place at family level, with suggested affinities including Aquifoliaceae, Escalloniaceae, Icacinaceae Monimiaceae and Trimeniaceae. In 1952, Dutch botanist Pieter van Royen created the family Sphenostemonaceae and included Sphenostemon as its only genus. This placement remained until 2009, when Sphenostemon was moved to the family Paracryphiaceae, along with Paracryphia and Quintinia, following the APG III system.

=== Species ===
As of October 2026, Plants of the World Online accepts the following nine species:

- Sphenostemon arfakensis (Gibbs) Steenis & Erdtman
- Sphenostemon balansae Baill.
- Sphenostemon comptonii Baker f.
- Sphenostemon lobosporus (F.Muell.) L.S.Sm.
- Sphenostemon oppositifolius Hürl.
- Sphenostemon pachycladus Baill.
- Sphenostemon papuanus (Lauterb.) Steenis & Erdtman
- Sphenostemon thibaudii Jérémie
- Sphenostemon tireliae Jérémie
