= Lyonetia penthesilea =

Scientific classification
- Kingdom: Animalia
- Phylum: Arthropoda
- Clade: Pancrustacea
- Class: Insecta
- Order: Lepidoptera
- Family: Lyonetiidae
- Genus: Lyonetia
- Species: L. penthesilea

Binomial name
- Lyonetia penthesilea Meyrick, 1921

Species of moth

Lyonetia penthesilea is a moth in the family Lyonetiidae.
