= Lyonetia scriptifera =

Scientific classification
- Kingdom: Animalia
- Phylum: Arthropoda
- Clade: Pancrustacea
- Class: Insecta
- Order: Lepidoptera
- Family: Lyonetiidae
- Genus: Lyonetia
- Species: L. scriptifera

Binomial name
- Lyonetia scriptifera Meyrick, 1921

Species of moth

Lyonetia scriptifera is a moth in the family Lyonetiidae. It is known to live in Australia.

As with many other species of this family, they probably mine the leaves of their host plant in the larval stage.
