= Lyonetia lechrioscia =

Scientific classification
- Kingdom: Animalia
- Phylum: Arthropoda
- Clade: Pancrustacea
- Class: Insecta
- Order: Lepidoptera
- Family: Lyonetiidae
- Genus: Lyonetia
- Species: L. lechrioscia

Binomial name
- Lyonetia lechrioscia Turner, 1926

Species of moth

Lyonetia lechrioscia is a moth in the family Lyonetiidae. It is known from Australia.

The larvae mine the leaves of their host plants, Quintinia sieberi and Quintinia verdonii.
