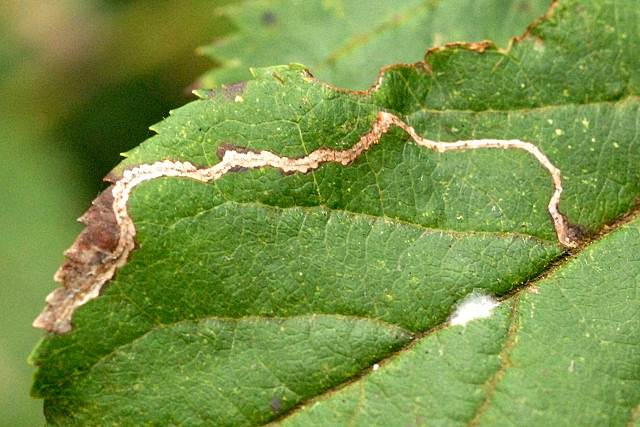
- Mine
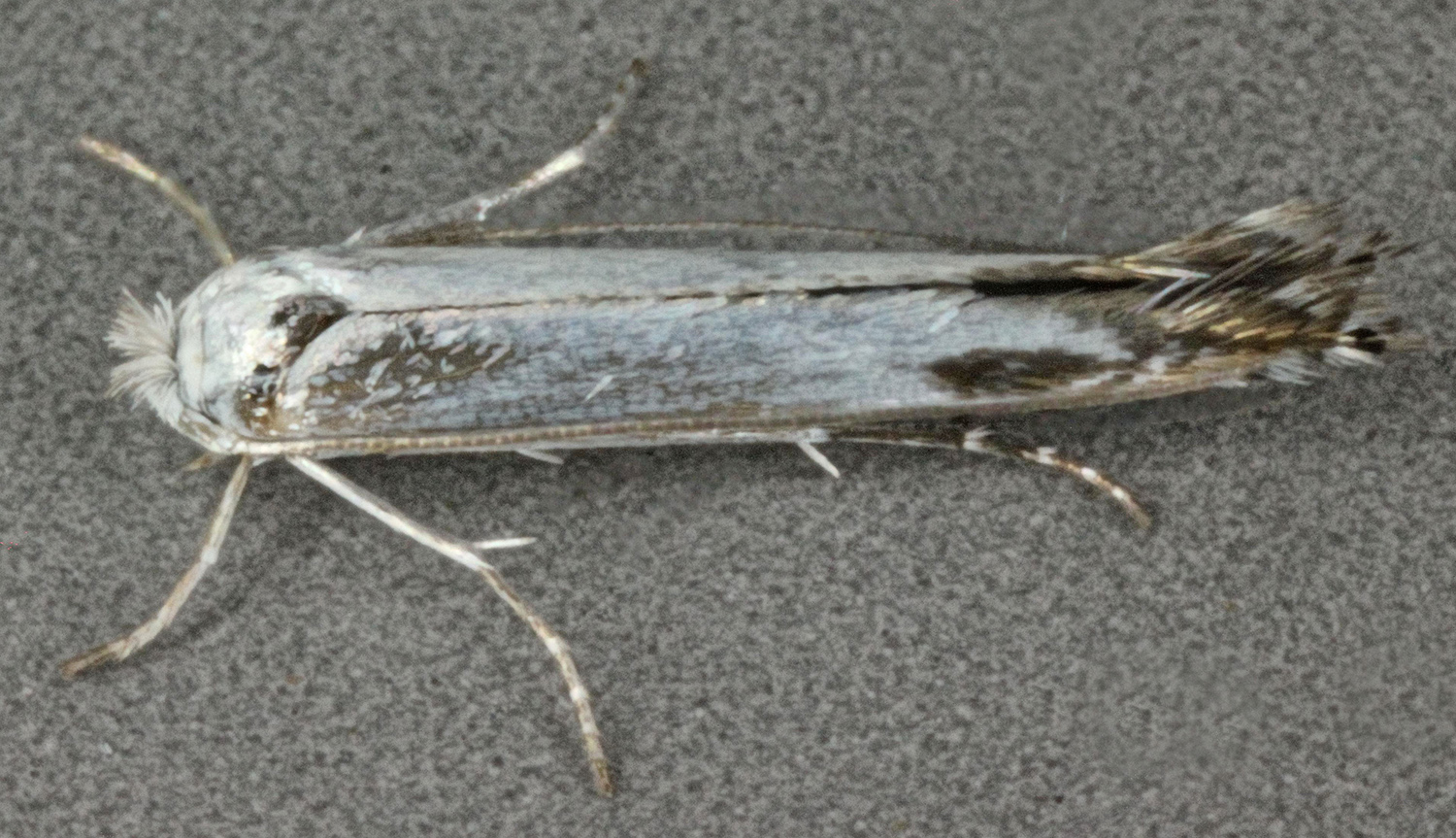
- Lyonetia clerkella, Dolydd Hafren, Wales

Scientific classification
- Kingdom: Animalia
- Phylum: Arthropoda
- Clade: Pancrustacea
- Class: Insecta
- Order: Lepidoptera
- Family: Lyonetiidae
- Genus: Lyonetia
- Species: L. clerkella

Binomial name
- Lyonetia clerkella (Linnaeus, 1758)

Synonyms
- Phalaena clerkella Linnaeus, 1758; Lyonetia penicilla Borkhausen, 1794; Lyonetia cerasifoliella Hübner, 1796; Lyonetia malifoliella Hübner, 1796; Lyonetia malella Schrank, 1802; Lyonetia autumnella Curtis, 1829; Lyonetia unipunctella Stephens, 1829; Lyonetia semiaurella Stephens, 1829; Lyonetia nivella Stephens, 1829; Lyonetia aereella Treitschke, 1833

= Lyonetia clerkella =

Species of moth

Lyonetia clerkella, the apple leaf miner, is a moth in the family Lyonetiidae. It is found all over Europe, north-western Siberia, the Far East, northern Africa, the Middle East, Turkey, India and Japan.

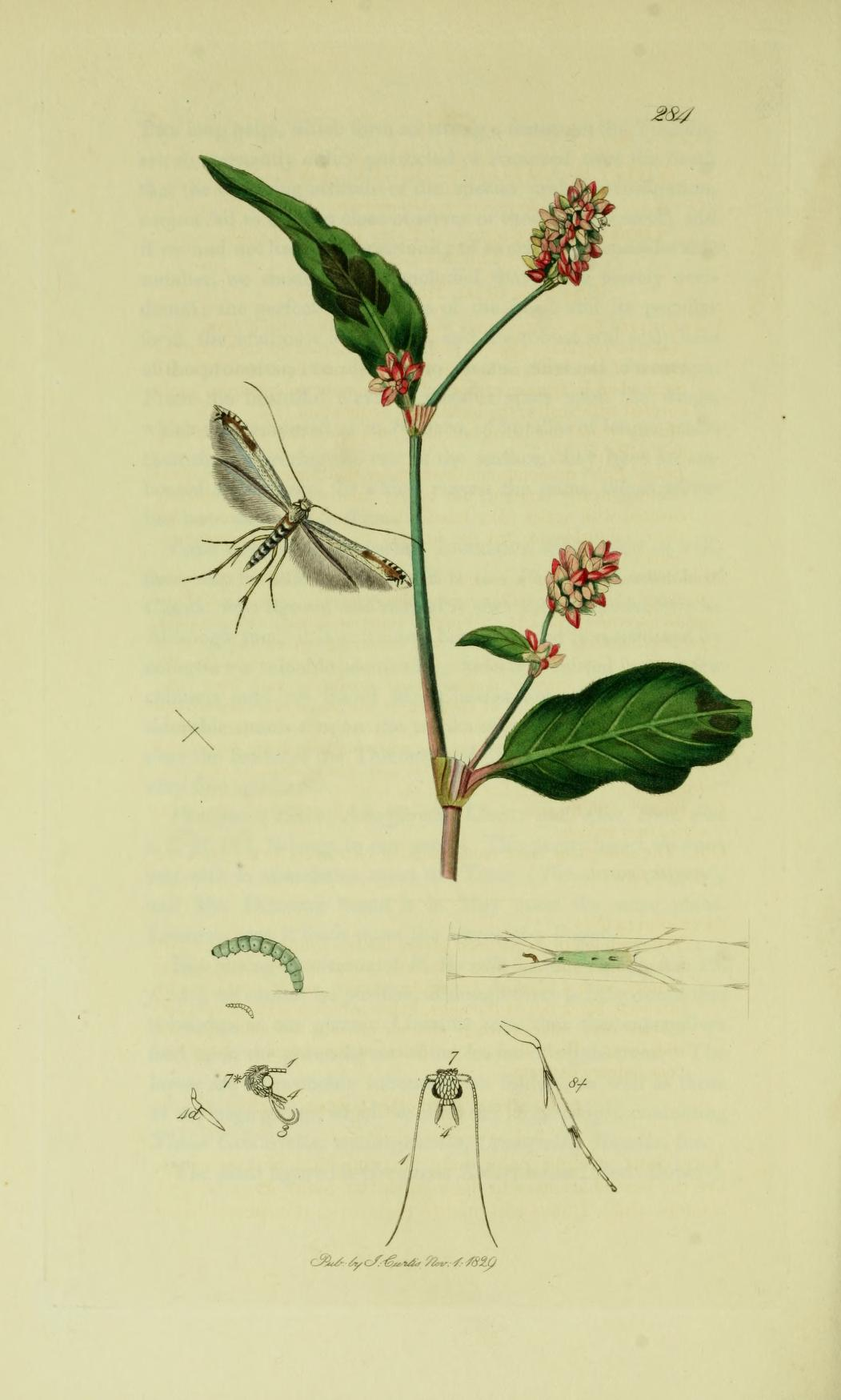
Illustration from John Curtis's British Entomology Volume 6

The wingspan is 7–9 mm. The forewings are shining white, sometimes partly or wholly suffused with fuscous; a brown or darker fuscous blotch in disc posteriorly; a bent transverse line beyond this, and three costal streaks connected with an apical spot brown or darker fuscous; a round black apical dot; a projecting blackish hook in apical cilia. Hindwings are dark grey. The larva is pale green.

Adults are on wing in June, August and from October to April in the Benelux. There are two or more generations per year.

The larvae feed on various fruit trees, including Betulaceae and Rosaceae species.
