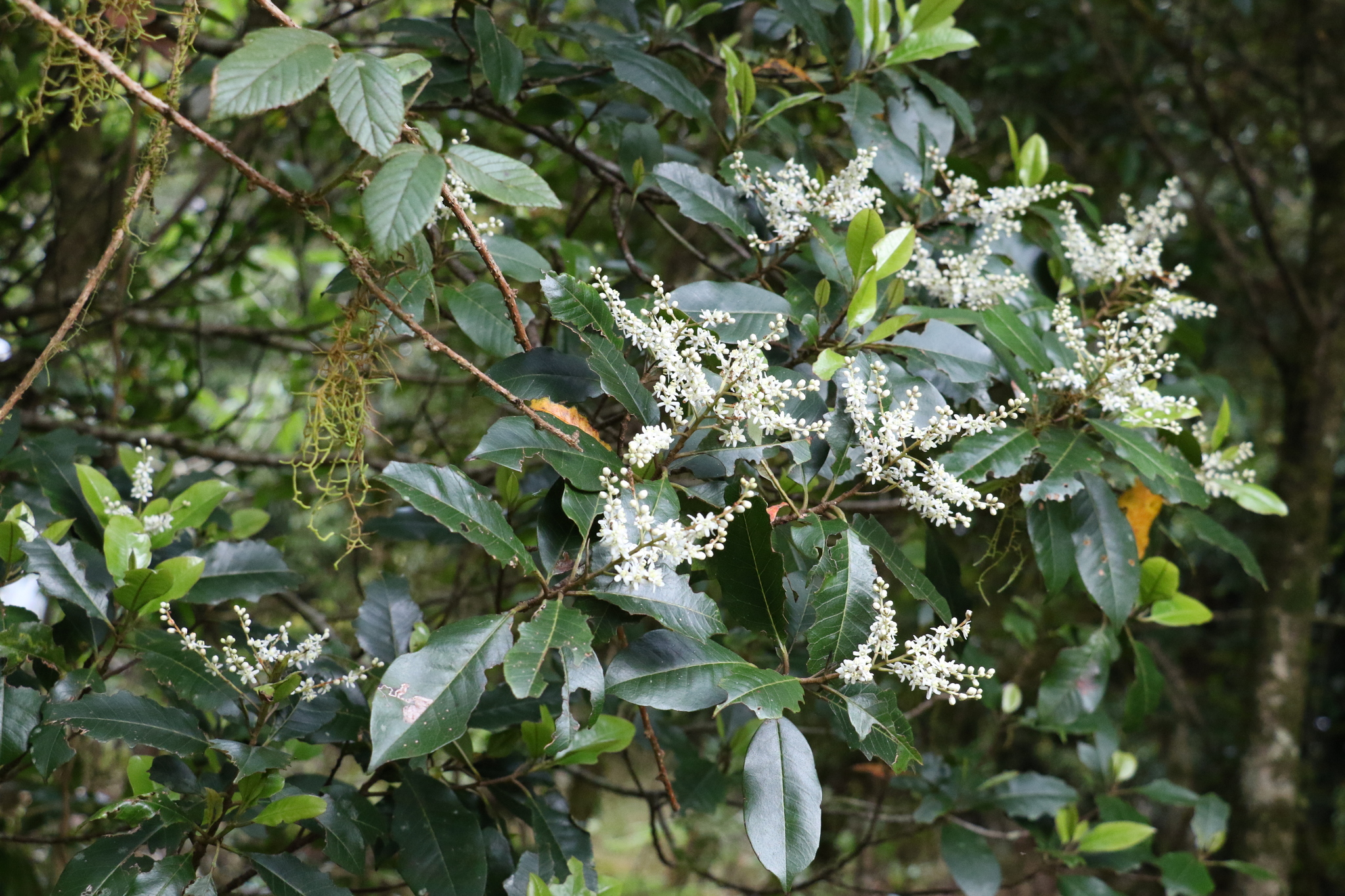

Scientific classification
- Kingdom: Plantae
- Clade: Tracheophytes
- Clade: Angiosperms
- Clade: Eudicots
- Clade: Asterids
- Order: Paracryphiales
- Family: Paracryphiaceae
- Genus: Quintinia
- Species: Q. sieberi

Binomial name
- Quintinia sieberi A.DC.

= Quintinia sieberi =

Possumwood

Species of tree

Quintinia sieberi, known as possumwood, is a rainforest tree of eastern Australia. It is mostly found in rainforests at high altitude. The range of natural distribution is between the Clyde River, New South Wales (35° S) and the McPherson Range (28° S) just over the border in the state of Queensland.

== Description ==
A medium-sized tree to 25 metres tall and a stem diameter of 75 cm.

The trunk is somewhat buttressed at the base, with a corky reddish brown bark. Leaves are alternate, not toothed, in the shape of an ellipse. 7 to 12 cm long with a short point. The underside of the leaf features tiny red dots. Leaf veins seen on both surfaces. The mid vein is depressed on the upper surface and raised on the underside.

White flowers form on panicles between the months of October and November. The fruit is a grey brown capsule, 3 mm in diameter with three to five cells within. Several seeds grow within each cell. Fruiting matures from December to January.

== Germination ==
Wind blown seeds often germinate in the form of a hemiepiphyte on the trunks of rocks and tree ferns such as Dicksonia antarctica. These seedlings can be eaten by the swamp wallaby if on the forest floor, (as seen on Mount Dromedary). As the roots of the germinating seeds are so small, care needs to be given to provide adequate moisture and protection from being buried or exposed. The seeds are tiny and seed regeneration requires a satisfactory substrate. It is advised to lightly cover the seeds with a seed raising potting mix.

== Ecology ==
Quintinia sieberi is host to the leaf miner moth Lyonetia lechrioscia.
