= Lyonetia bakuchia =

Scientific classification
- Kingdom: Animalia
- Phylum: Arthropoda
- Class: Insecta
- Order: Lepidoptera
- Family: Lyonetiidae
- Genus: Lyonetia
- Species: L. bakuchia

Binomial name
- Lyonetia bakuchia Kuroko, 1964

Species of moth

Lyonetia bakuchia is a moth in the Lyonetiidae family. It is known from Japan (Kyushu, Yakushima).

The wingspan is 7-7.5 mm. Adults are on wing from the end of October to the end of November.

The larvae feed on Prunus zippeliana. They mine the leaves of their host plant.
