= Lyonetia leurodes =

Scientific classification
- Kingdom: Animalia
- Phylum: Arthropoda
- Class: Insecta
- Order: Lepidoptera
- Family: Lyonetiidae
- Genus: Lyonetia
- Species: L. leurodes

Binomial name
- Lyonetia leurodes Meyrick, 1915

Species of moth

Lyonetia leurodes is a moth in the family Lyonetiidae. It is known from Namunukula, Sri Lanka.

This species has a wingspan of 7 mm and is ochreous-bronzy grey.
