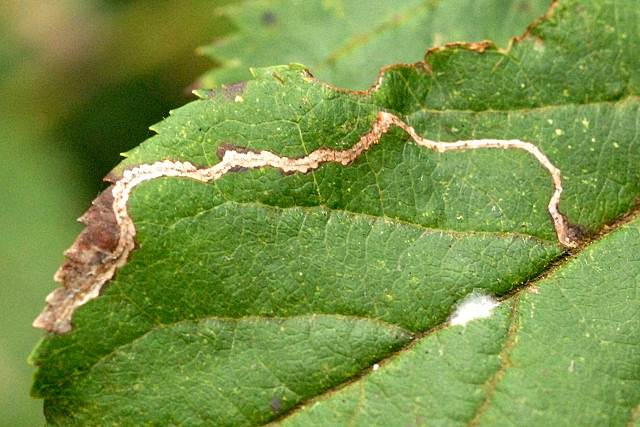
- Lyonetia clerkella leaf mine

Scientific classification
- Kingdom: Animalia
- Phylum: Arthropoda
- Class: Insecta
- Order: Lepidoptera
- Family: Lyonetiidae
- Genus: Lyonetia; Hübner, 1825

Synonyms
- Elachista Kollar, 1832 (suppressed); Gracillarioides Bruand, 1850; Nocturno Gistl, [1847]; Olethria Gistl, 1848; Argyromis Stephens, 1829; Argyromiges Curtis, 1829; Argyromyges Stephens, 1834; Lyonnetia Gistl, 1847; Argyromus Bruand, 1851; Lyonetiola Kuroko, 1964 (Subgenus)

= Lyonetia =

Genus of moths

Lyonetia is a genus of moths in the family Lyonetiidae. There are 31 known species that a part of this genus.

== Species ==
- Lyonetia alniella Chambers, 1875
- Lyonetia anthemopa Meyrick, 1936
- Lyonetia bakuchia Kuroko, 1964
- Lyonetia boehmeriella Kuroko, 1964
- Lyonetia boraginaceae Ghesquière, 1940 (Congo)
- Lyonetia candida Braun, 1916
- Lyonetia carcinota Meyrick, 1910 (Mauritius)
- Lyonetia castaneella Kuroko, 1964
- Lyonetia clerkella (Linnaeus, 1758) – apple leaf miner
- Lyonetia cotifraga Meyrick, 1909 (South Africa)
- Lyonetia embolotypa Turner, 1923 (Australia)
- Lyonetia euryella Kuroko, 1964
- Lyonetia latistrigella Walsingham, 1882
- Lyonetia lechrioscia Turner, 1926 (Australia)
- Lyonetia ledi Wocke, 1859
- Lyonetia leurodes Meyrick, 1915 (Sri Lanka)
- Lyonetia luxurians Meyrick, 1922 (Fiji)
- Lyonetia melanochalca Meyrick, 1911 (India)
- Lyonetia meridiana Kuroko, 1982
- Lyonetia myricella Kuroko, 1964
- Lyonetia penthesilea Meyrick, 1921 (Australia)
- Lyonetia photina Turner, 1923 (Australia)
- Lyonetia praefulva (Meyrick, 1911) (India and Sri Lanka)
- Lyonetia probolactis (Meyrick, 1911) (Seychelles)
- Lyonetia prunifoliella (Hübner, 1796)
- Lyonetia pulverulentella Zeller, 1839
- Lyonetia saliciella Busck, 1904
- Lyonetia scriptifera Meyrick, 1921 (Australia)
- Lyonetia spinitarsis Meyrick 1922 (Fiji)
- Lyonetia torquens Meyrick, 1922 (India)
- Lyonetia yasudai Kuroko, 1964
