= Lyonetia carcinota =

Scientific classification
- Kingdom: Animalia
- Phylum: Arthropoda
- Class: Insecta
- Order: Lepidoptera
- Family: Lyonetiidae
- Genus: Lyonetia
- Species: L. carcinota

Binomial name
- Lyonetia carcinota Meyrick, 1910

Species of moth

Lyonetia carcinota is a moth in the family Lyonetiidae. It is known from Mauritius.

This species has a wingspan of 10 mm, the head, palpae, antennae and thorax are silvery-white, the forewings are very narrowly elongated and short pointed of light ochreous colour, with the basal third silvery-white and with an oblique white mark beyond the middle of the wing. Five very small white spots are found on the last third of the costa. The hindwings are dark-grey.
