= Paracryphia =

Scientific classification
- Kingdom: Plantae
- Clade: Tracheophytes
- Clade: Angiosperms
- Clade: Eudicots
- Clade: Asterids
- Order: Paracryphiales
- Family: Paracryphiaceae
- Genus: Paracryphia; Baker f.
- Species: P. alticola

Binomial name
- Paracryphia alticola (Schltr.) Steenis

Synonyms
- Species: Ascarina alticola Schltr.; Paracryphia alticola var. suaveolens (Baker f.) Steenis; Paracryphia suaveolens Baker f.

Genus of shrubs

Paracryphia is a genus of a single species, Paracryphia alticola, a small tree or shrub endemic to New Caledonia in the family Paracryphiaceae. Its closest relative is Sphenostemon.
