= Lyonetia ledi =

Scientific classification
- Kingdom: Animalia
- Phylum: Arthropoda
- Clade: Pancrustacea
- Class: Insecta
- Order: Lepidoptera
- Family: Lyonetiidae
- Genus: Lyonetia
- Species: L. ledi

Binomial name
- Lyonetia ledi Wocke, 1859

Species of moth

Lyonetia ledi is a moth in the family Lyonetiidae. It is found in most of Europe, except Great Britain, Ireland, the Iberian Peninsula, Italy and the Balkan Peninsula.

The wingspan is 8–9 mm.

The larvae feed on Myrica gale and Ledum palustre. They mine the leaves of their host plant.
