= Lyonetia cotifraga =

Scientific classification
- Kingdom: Animalia
- Phylum: Arthropoda
- Class: Insecta
- Order: Lepidoptera
- Family: Lyonetiidae
- Genus: Lyonetia
- Species: L. cotifraga

Binomial name
- Lyonetia cotifraga Meyrick, 1909

Species of moth

Lyonetia cotifraga is a moth in the family Lyonetiidae. It is known from South Africa.
