= Lyonetia boehmeriella =

Scientific classification
- Kingdom: Animalia
- Phylum: Arthropoda
- Class: Insecta
- Order: Lepidoptera
- Family: Lyonetiidae
- Genus: Lyonetia
- Species: L. boehmeriella

Binomial name
- Lyonetia boehmeriella Kuroko, 1964

Species of moth

Lyonetia boehmeriella is a moth in the Lyonetiidae family. It is known from Kyushu island of Japan.

The wingspan is 6–7 mm. Adults are on wing from the middle of April to the middle of May, from the end of June to the beginning of July, from the end of July to the beginning of August, at the end of August and at the middle of October. There are several generations per year.

The larvae feed on Boehmeria spicata. They mine the leaves of their host plant.
