= Lyonetia myricella =

Scientific classification
- Kingdom: Animalia
- Phylum: Arthropoda
- Class: Insecta
- Order: Lepidoptera
- Family: Lyonetiidae
- Genus: Lyonetia
- Species: L. myricella

Binomial name
- Lyonetia myricella Kuroko, 1964

Species of moth

Lyonetia myricella is a moth in the family Lyonetiidae. It is known from Japan (Kyushu, Yakushima).

The wingspan is about 7–7.5 mm. Adults are on wing in November.

The larvae feed on Myrica rubra. They mine the leaves of their host plant.
