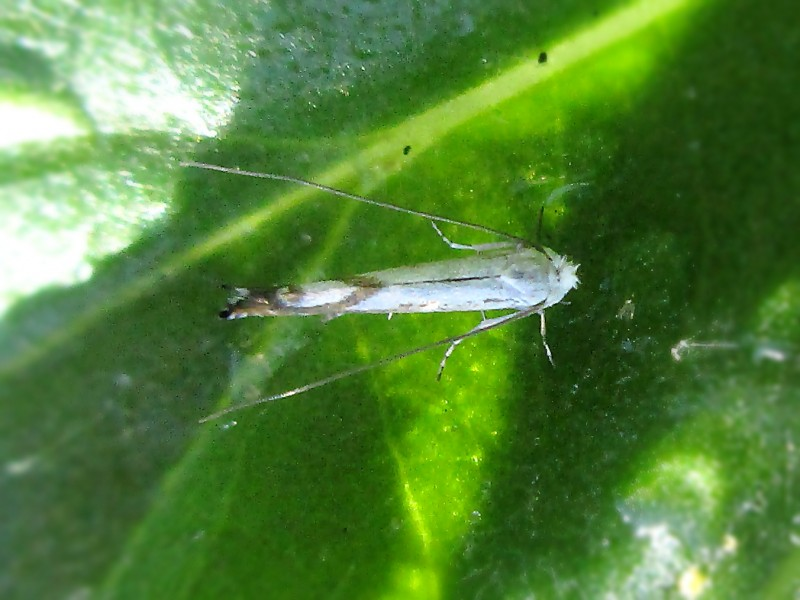

Scientific classification
- Domain: Eukaryota
- Kingdom: Animalia
- Phylum: Arthropoda
- Class: Insecta
- Order: Lepidoptera
- Family: Lyonetiidae
- Genus: Lyonetia
- Species: L. prunifoliella

Binomial name
- Lyonetia prunifoliella (Hübner, 1796)

Synonyms
- Tinea prunifoliella Hübner 1796; Lyonetia speculella Clemens, 1862; Lyonetia padifoliella Hübner, [1813]; Lyonetia sittaepenella Hübner, 1825; Lyonetia acerifoliella Curtis, 1850; Lyonetia malinella Matsumura, 1907

= Lyonetia prunifoliella =

Species of moth

Lyonetia prunifoliella is a moth in the family Lyonetiidae.

== Distribution ==
It is found in most of Europe, except Ireland, the Iberian Peninsula, and the Mediterranean islands. It was considered extinct in Great Britain, but has recently been recorded. It is also known from Turkey, Kazakhstan, south-eastern Siberia, the Far East, Japan and North America.

== Description ==
The wingspan is 9–10 mm. Adults are on wing in September, and overwinter, appearing again in the spring.

The larvae feed on Betula pendula, Betula pubescens, Chaenomeles japonica, Cotoneaster integerrimus, Crataegus monogyna, Cydonia oblonga, Mespilus germanica, Prunus armeniaca, Prunus cerasifera, Prunus dulcis, Prunus mahaleb, Prunus persica, Prunus spinosa, Pyrus communis and Sorbus species. They mine the leaves of their host plant. Eggs are deposited in the underside of a leaf. Around the oviposition site a cavity develops, that in the end often leaves a hole in the leaf. Then, the mine becomes a narrow, hardly widening, winding corridor, largely filled with a broad reddish-brown frass line. The corridor then widens into a wide, full depth blotch, often against the leaf margin. The larva may leave its mine and start a new one, sometimes on a different leaf.

== Subspecies ==
- Lyonetia prunifoliella prunifoliella
- Lyonetia prunifoliella malinella (Matsumura, 1907) (Japan)
