= Lyonetia castaneella =

Scientific classification
- Kingdom: Animalia
- Phylum: Arthropoda
- Class: Insecta
- Order: Lepidoptera
- Family: Lyonetiidae
- Genus: Lyonetia
- Species: L. castaneella

Binomial name
- Lyonetia castaneella Kuroko, 1964

Species of moth

Lyonetia castaneella is a moth in the Lyonetiidae family. It is found in Russia (the southern part of Primorskii Territory) and Japan.

The wingspan is 6.5–7 mm. There are two distinct forms, an aestival (summer) and autumnal form. Adults are on wing from July to August in the southern part of the Primorskii Territory.

The larvae feed on Alnus japonica, Castanea cretata and Quercus acutissima. They mine the leaves of their host plant.
