= Lyonetia euryella =

Scientific classification
- Kingdom: Animalia
- Phylum: Arthropoda
- Class: Insecta
- Order: Lepidoptera
- Family: Lyonetiidae
- Genus: Lyonetia
- Species: L. euryella

Binomial name
- Lyonetia euryella Kuroko, 1964

Species of moth

Lyonetia euryella is a moth in the family Lyonetiidae. It is known from the islands of Honshu, Kyushu and Yakushima in Japan.

The wingspan is 8–10 mm. Adults are on wing from the beginning to the middle of May, from the middle of June to the beginning of July, from the end of July to the beginning of August and from the beginning of September to the beginning of October. There are four generations per year.

The larvae feed on Eurya japonica. They mine the leaves of their host plant.
