= Lyonetia probolactis =

Scientific classification
- Kingdom: Animalia
- Phylum: Arthropoda
- Class: Insecta
- Order: Lepidoptera
- Family: Lyonetiidae
- Genus: Lyonetia
- Species: L. probolactis

Binomial name
- Lyonetia probolactis Meyrick, 1911

Species of moth

Lyonetia probolactis is a moth in the family Lyonetiidae. It is known from Mahé and Silhouette islands in the Seychelles.

This species has a wingspan of 9–10 mm – head, palpi, antennae and thorax are silvery with, crown smooth. Forewings are pale shiny silvery grey, an ochreous-brown fascia about 2/3, triangularly expanded towards costa where it unites with an ochreous-brown apical patch, within which is a small round black apical spot, preceded by two small white costal marks partly in cilia. Cilia are pale grey.
