= Lyonetia anthemopa =

Scientific classification
- Kingdom: Animalia
- Phylum: Arthropoda
- Class: Insecta
- Order: Lepidoptera
- Family: Lyonetiidae
- Genus: Lyonetia
- Species: L. anthemopa

Binomial name
- Lyonetia anthemopa Meyrick, 1936

Species of moth

Lyonetia anthemopa is a moth in the family Lyonetiidae. It is known from Japan (Honshu, Kyushu, Yakushima) and Taiwan.

The wingspan is 5–8 mm. There are four generations per year in Japan.

The larvae feed on Pyracantha angustifolia, Pyracantha crenurata, Rhapiolepis umbellata and Photinia taiwanensis. They mine the leaves of their host plant.
