= Lyonetia embolotypa =

Scientific classification
- Kingdom: Animalia
- Phylum: Arthropoda
- Clade: Pancrustacea
- Class: Insecta
- Order: Lepidoptera
- Family: Lyonetiidae
- Genus: Lyonetia
- Species: L. embolotypa

Binomial name
- Lyonetia embolotypa Turner, 1923

Species of moth

Lyonetia embolotypa is a moth in the family Lyonetiidae. It is known from Australia.

They probably mine the leaves of their host plant.
