= Lyonetia melanochalca =

Scientific classification
- Kingdom: Animalia
- Phylum: Arthropoda
- Class: Insecta
- Order: Lepidoptera
- Family: Lyonetiidae
- Genus: Lyonetia
- Species: L. melanochalca

Binomial name
- Lyonetia melanochalca Meyrick, 1911

Species of moth

Lyonetia melanochalca is a moth in the family Lyonetiidae.

== Distribution ==
It is known from Khasis, India.

This species has a wingspan of 8–11 mm.
