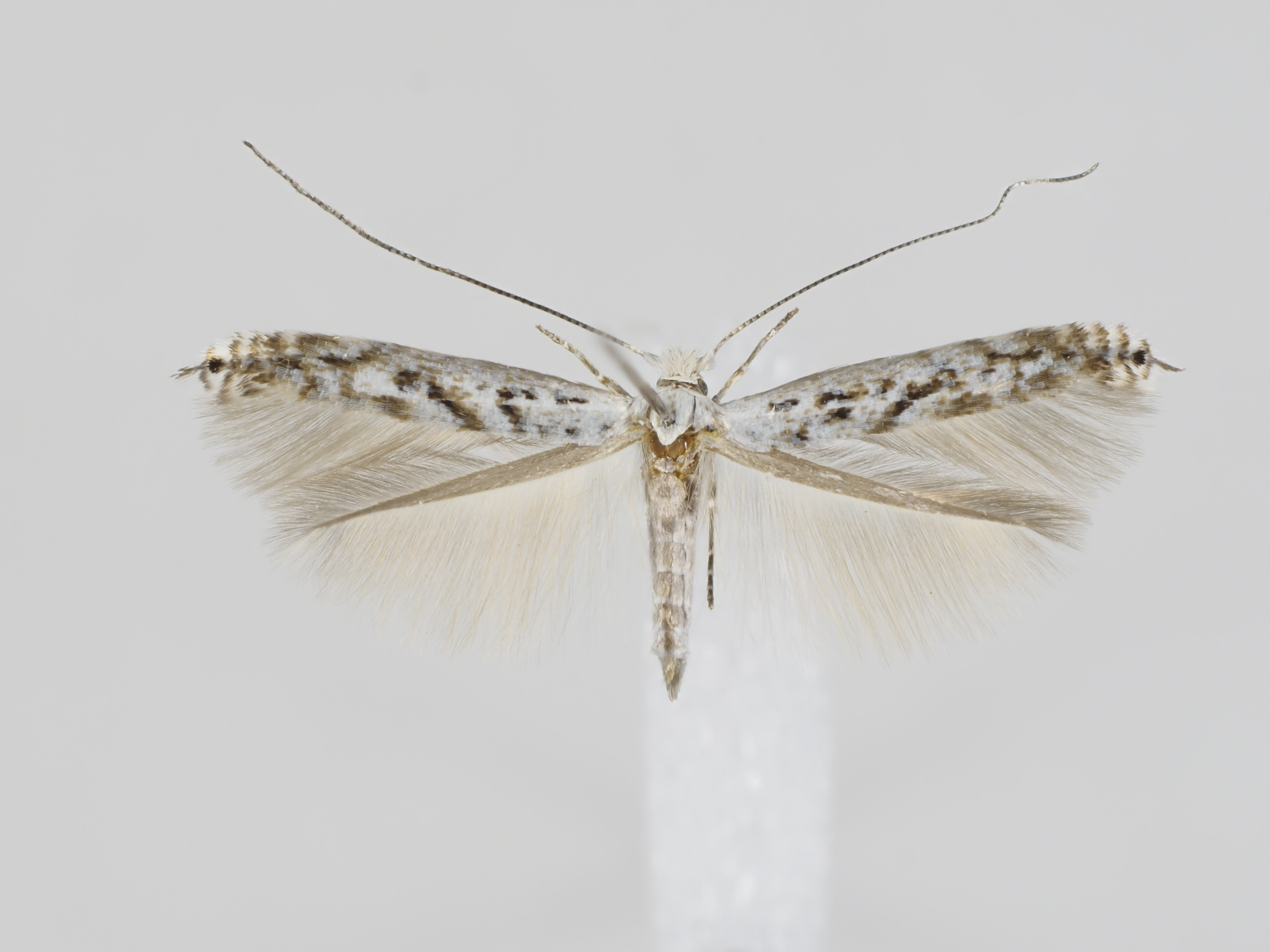

Scientific classification
- Kingdom: Animalia
- Phylum: Arthropoda
- Clade: Pancrustacea
- Class: Insecta
- Order: Lepidoptera
- Family: Lyonetiidae
- Genus: Lyonetia
- Species: L. pulverulentella

Binomial name
- Lyonetia pulverulentella Zeller, 1839

Synonyms
- Lyonetia frigidariella Herrich-Schaffer, 1855

= Lyonetia pulverulentella =

Species of moth

Lyonetia pulverulentella is a moth in the family Lyonetiidae. It is found from central Europe eastward into Russia and Ukraine. It was recently reported from British Columbia, Canada.

The wingspan is 12 to 14 millimetres (0.47 to 0.55 in). Adults are on wing from May to September.

The larvae feed on Salix species. They mine the leaves of their host plant.
