= Lyonetia yasudai =

Scientific classification
- Kingdom: Animalia
- Phylum: Arthropoda
- Class: Insecta
- Order: Lepidoptera
- Family: Lyonetiidae
- Genus: Lyonetia
- Species: L. yasudai

Binomial name
- Lyonetia yasudai Kuroko, 1964

Species of moth

Lyonetia yasudai is a moth in the family Lyonetiidae. It is known from Honshu, the main island of Japan.

The wingspan is 6.5–7 mm.

The larvae feed on Quercus acuta. They mine the leaves of their host plant.
