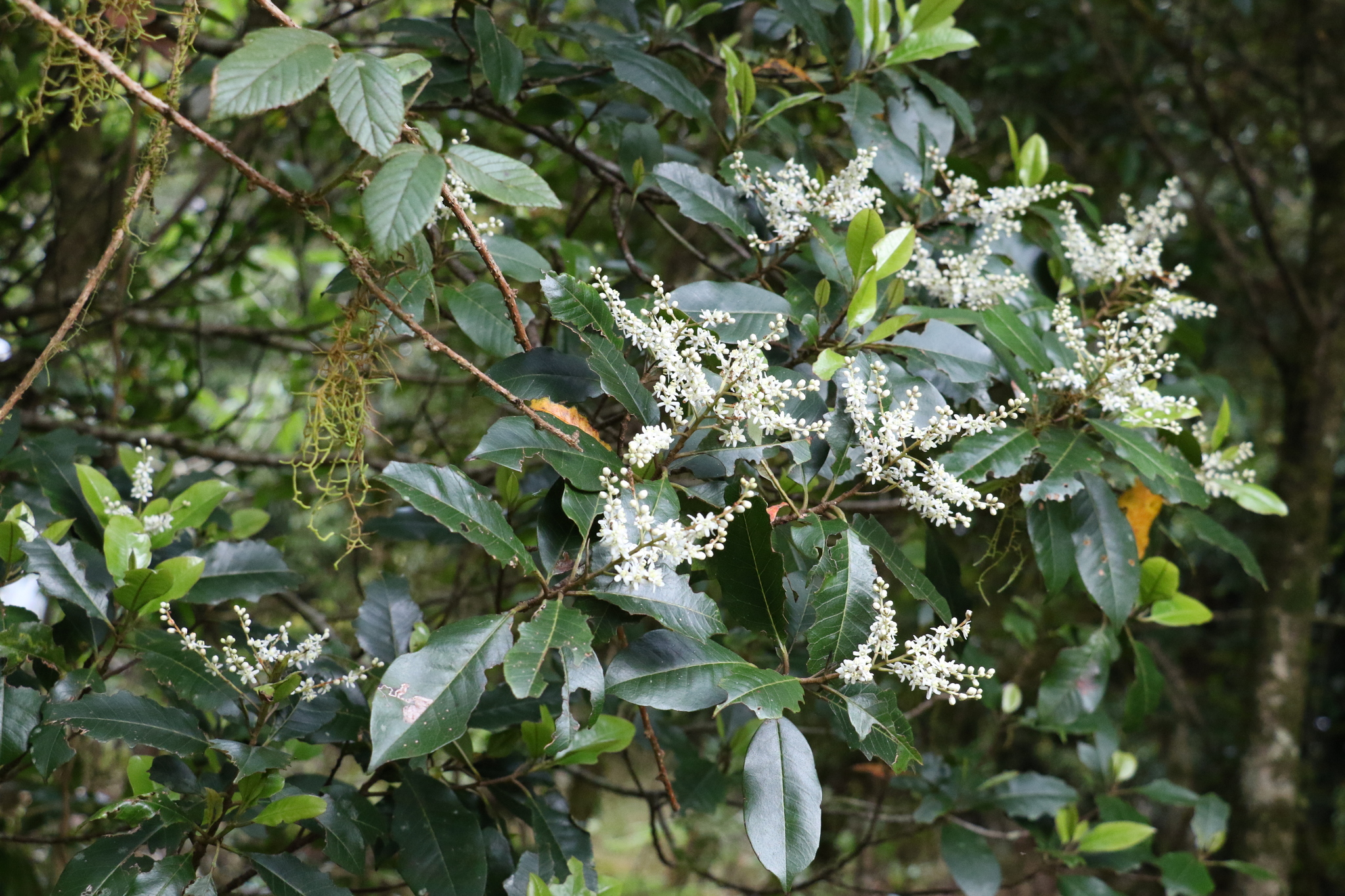
- Quintinia sieberi

Scientific classification
- Kingdom: Plantae
- Clade: Tracheophytes
- Clade: Angiosperms
- Clade: Eudicots
- Clade: Asterids
- Order: Paracryphiales
- Family: Paracryphiaceae
- Genus: Quintinia; A.DC.

Species
- See text

Synonyms
- Curraniodendron Merr.; Dedea Baill.

= Quintinia =

Genus of plants

Quintinia is a genus of about 25 evergreen trees and shrubs in the family Paracryphiaceae, native to the Philippines, New Guinea, New Zealand, New Caledonia, Vanuatu and Australia. Plants have alternate leaves. White or lilac flowers form at the end of stalks or on leaf axils. The fruiting body is a capsule, usually containing a large number of tiny seeds. The genus is named after the gardener Jean-Baptiste de la Quintinie.

== Species ==
As of October 2025, Plants of the World Online accepts the following 26 species:

- Quintinia altigena Schltr. – New Guinea
- Quintinia apoensis (Elmer) Schltr. – Philippines
- Quintinia brassii Reeder – New Guinea
- Quintinia elliptica Hook.f. – North Island of New Zealand
- Quintinia epiphytica Mattf. – Papua New Guinea
- Quintinia fawkneri F.Muell. – northeastern Queensland
- Quintinia hyehenensis Pillon & Hequet – New Caledonia
- Quintinia kuborensis P.Royen – Papua New Guinea
- Quintinia lanceolata Reeder – Papua New Guinea
- Quintinia ledermannii Schltr. – Papua New Guinea
- Quintinia macgregorii F.Muell. – Papua New Guinea
- Quintinia macrophylla Hatus. ex O.K.Paul – New Guinea
- Quintinia major (Baill.) Schltr. – New Caledonia
- Quintinia media (Baill.) Guillaumin – New Caledonia and Vanuatu
- Quintinia minor (Baill.) Schltr. – New Caledonia
- Quintinia montiswilhelmii P.Royen – Papua New Guinea
- Quintinia nutantifora Schltr. – Papua New Guinea
- Quintinia oreophila (Schltr.) Schltr. – New Caledonia
- Quintinia pachyphylla Schltr. – Papua New Guinea
- Quintinia quatrefagesii F.Muell. – northeastern Queensland
- Quintinia rigida Ridl. – western New Guinea
- Quintinia schlechterana Otto Christian Schmidt – New Guinea
- Quintinia serrata A.Cunn. – New Zealand
- Quintinia sessiliflora Pillon & Hequet – New Caledonia
- Quintinia sieberi A.DC. – southeastern Queensland and eastern New South Wales
- Quintinia verdonii F.Muell. – eastern Australia
