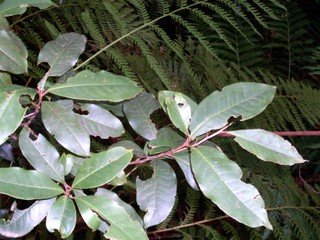
- Quintinia sieberi

Scientific classification
- Kingdom: Plantae
- Clade: Tracheophytes
- Clade: Angiosperms
- Clade: Eudicots
- Clade: Asterids
- Order: Paracryphiales; Takht. ex Reveal
- Family: Paracryphiaceae; Airy Shaw

Genera
- Paracryphia; Quintinia; Sphenostemon

= Paracryphiaceae =

Family of shrubs

The Paracryphiaceae are a family of woody shrubs and trees native to Australia, southeast Asia, and New Caledonia. In the APG III system of 2009, the family is placed in its own order, Paracryphiales, in the campanulid clade of the asterids. In the earlier APG II system, the family was unplaced as to order and included only Paracryphia.

As presently circumscribed, the family includes three genera:

- Paracryphia Baker f. – 1 species, endemic to New Caledonia
- Quintinia A.DC – 25 species in the Philippines, New Guinea, the east coast of Australia, New Zealand and New Caledonia; formerly placed in the Quintiniaceae
- Sphenostemon Baill. – 10 species in New Guinea, Australia (Queensland) and New Caledonia; formerly placed in the Sphenostemonaceae

The evolutionary (phylogenetic) relationship of the family and its three genera is believed to be:

- - Apiales
  - - Paracryphiaceae
      - Quintinia
      - - Paracryphia
        - Sphenostemon
    - Dipsacales
