= Eudonia vinasalis =

Scientific classification
- Kingdom: Animalia
- Phylum: Arthropoda
- Class: Insecta
- Order: Lepidoptera
- Family: Crambidae
- Genus: Eudonia
- Species: E. vinasalis

Binomial name
- Eudonia vinasalis (Dyar, 1929)

Synonyms
- Scoparia vinasalis Dyar, 1929

Species of moth

Eudonia vinasalis is a moth in the family Crambidae. It was described by Harrison Gray Dyar Jr. in 1929. It is found in Costa Rica.

The wingspan is about 10 mm. The markings on the wings are similar to those of Eudonia crassiuscula, but smaller and more delicate. The marks are more smooth and even, the terminal space contrastingly dark, with a pale blotch centrally. The ground colour has a tint of lilaceous, especially in females. Adults have been recorded on wing in January, May and November.
