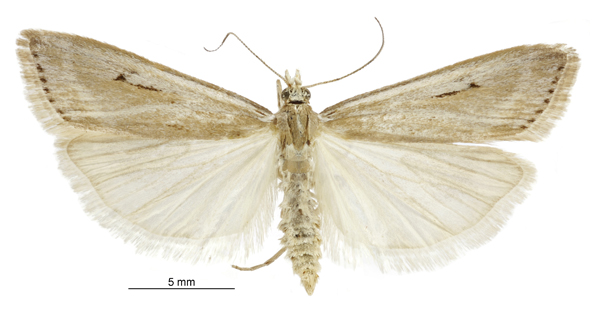
- male

Scientific classification
- Kingdom: Animalia
- Phylum: Arthropoda
- Class: Insecta
- Order: Lepidoptera
- Family: Crambidae
- Genus: Eudonia
- Species: E. deltophora

Binomial name
- Eudonia deltophora (Meyrick, 1884)

Synonyms
- Scoparia deltophora Meyrick, 1884

= Eudonia deltophora =

Species of moth

Eudonia deltophora is a moth in the family Crambidae. It was described by Edward Meyrick in 1884. This species is endemic to New Zealand.

The wingspan is 21–23 mm. The forewings are light greyish-ochreous, irrorated with whitish. The hindwings are grey-whitish. Adults have been recorded on wing in January.
