= Eudonia expallidalis =

Scientific classification
- Kingdom: Animalia
- Phylum: Arthropoda
- Class: Insecta
- Order: Lepidoptera
- Family: Crambidae
- Genus: Eudonia
- Species: E. expallidalis

Binomial name
- Eudonia expallidalis (Dyar, 1906)

Synonyms
- Scoparia expallidalis Dyar, 1906; Scoparia rufitinctalis Hampson, 1907

Species of moth

Eudonia expallidalis is a moth in the family Crambidae. It was described by Harrison Gray Dyar Jr. in 1906. It is found in North America, where it has been recorded from Washington to Nevada and California.

The wingspan is about 20 mm. The forewings are pale gray with a pale brown inner line. The hindwings are white, tinged with gray. Adults have been recorded on wing in March and from May to July.
