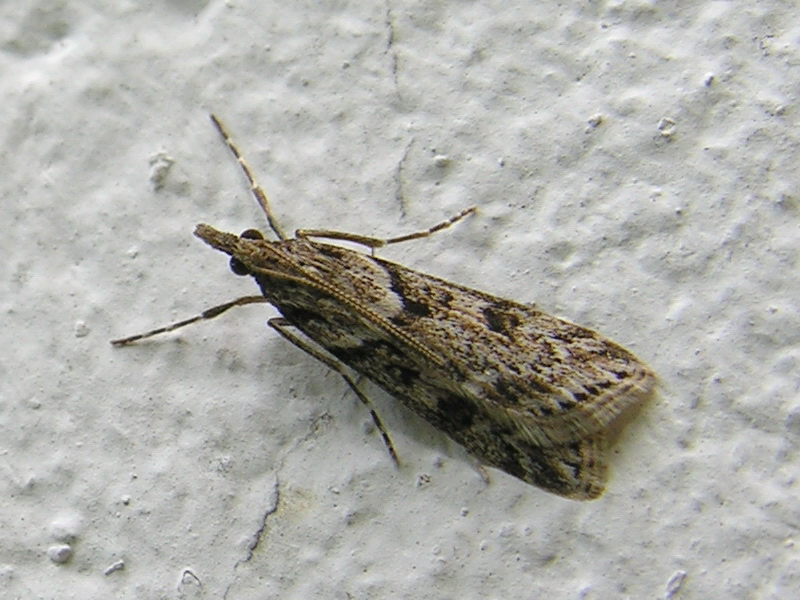
- Eudonia angustea imago Oza dos Ríos, Galicia, Spain

Scientific classification
- Kingdom: Animalia
- Phylum: Arthropoda
- Clade: Pancrustacea
- Class: Insecta
- Order: Lepidoptera
- Family: Crambidae
- Subfamily: Scopariinae
- Genus: Eudonia; Billberg, 1820

Type species
- Phalaena mercurella Linnaeus, 1758

Diversity
- About 250 species

Synonyms
- Boiea Zetterstedt, 1839; Borea (lapsus); Dipleurina Chapman, 1912; Dipluerina (lapsus); Epileucia (nomen nudum); Malageudonia Leraut, 1989; Vietteina Leraut, 1989; Witlesia Chapman, 1912; Wittlesia (lapsus)

= Eudonia =

Genus of moths

Eudonia is a large and widespread genus in the grass moth family (Crambidae), subfamily Scopariinae. There is no common name for the roughly 250 species placed here; new species are still being described regularly. Although the genus was proposed early in the 19th century, many of these moths were for a long time retained in Scoparia, the type genus of the subfamily and a close relative of Eudonia. A few small genera have been proposed for separation from Eudonia, but given the size of this group this is not particularly convincing; thus, all are retained here pending a comprehensive phylogenetic review.

== Description and ecology ==
They are usually greyish-brownish and rather inconspicuous moths, though some are more boldly patterned in blackish, pale and even yellow hues. Like their close relatives, they lack the loop formed by forewing veins 1a/1b, and their labial palps are elongated and project straightly, appearing like a pointed "beak". The genitals have a characteristically simple shape in this genus; while they cannot usually be depended upon to differ significantly between species, they allow to distinguish this genus from similar moths. In the males, the clasper's harpe has few if any unusual features, the aedeagus is usually a rather nondescript rod, and the vesica bears a characteristic small disc with a grainy surface. In females, the ductus bursae is kinked at the junction of the forward (membranous) and hind (sclerotized) parts, with a particularly heavy sclerotized triangle bearing small teeth half-hidden in the kink.

They are common across the world's continents except in deserts, on high mountains, and in glaciated areas. They are apparently able to disperse well over water, as evidenced by the Polynesian radiations which occur mainly from Hawaiian Islands to the Austral Islands as well as on New Zealand; several of these island endemics might nowadays be rare or extinct due to the disappearance of their food plants, but overall the genus is not yet very well studied. As far as is known, the caterpillar larvae of most Eudonia feed on mosses, namely of subclasses Bryidae and Dicranidae; some also eat lichen. In a few cases, other food plants have been recorded or suspected, such as Colobanthus pearlworts or woody asterids of genus Olearia (daisy-bushes).

== Species ==
- Eudonia abrupta W. Li, 2012
- Eudonia achlya J.F.G. Clarke, 1986
- Eudonia actias (Meyrick, 1899)
- Eudonia aeolias (Meyrick, 1899)
- Eudonia aequalis Kyrki & Svensson in Palm, 1986
- Eudonia albafascicula (Salmon & Bradley, 1956)
- Eudonia albertalis (Dyar, 1929)
- Eudonia albilinea Sasaki, 1998
- Eudonia alopecias (Meyrick, 1901)
- Eudonia alpina (J. Curtis, 1850) (including E. lugubralis)
- Eudonia alticola (Leraut, 1989)
- Eudonia amphicypella (Meyrick, 1899)
- Eudonia angustea (J. Curtis, 1827)
- Eudonia anthracias (Meyrick, 1885)
- Eudonia antimacha (Meyrick, 1899)
- Eudonia aphrodes (Meyrick, 1884)
- Eudonia apicifusca Sasaki, 1999
- Eudonia aplysia J.F.G. Clarke, 1986
- Eudonia ara J.F.G. Clarke, 1986
- Eudonia asaleuta (Meyrick, 1907)
- Eudonia aspidota (Meyrick, 1884)
- Eudonia asterisca (Meyrick, 1885)
- Eudonia atmogramma (Meyrick, 1915)
- Eudonia australialis (Guenée, 1854)
- Eudonia axena (Meyrick, 1884)
- Eudonia balanopis (Meyrick, 1899)
- Eudonia bidentata Maes, 2004
- Eudonia bisinualis (Hudson, 1928)
- Eudonia bronzalis (Barnes & Benjamin, 1922)
- Eudonia bucolica (Meyrick, 1899)
- Eudonia camerounensis Maes, 1996
- Eudonia cataxesta (Meyrick, 1884)
- Eudonia cavata Li, Li & Nuss, 2012
- Eudonia chalara (Meyrick, 1901)
- Eudonia characta (Meyrick, 1885)
- Eudonia chlamydota (Meyrick, 1885)
- Eudonia choristis (Meyrick, 1907)
- Eudonia chrysomicta (Meyrick, 1929)
- Eudonia chrysopetra (Meyrick, 1929)
- Eudonia citrocosma (Meyrick, 1929)
- Eudonia clavula J.F.G. Clarke, 1986
- Eudonia cleodoralis (Walker, 1859)
- Eudonia clerica (Meyrick, 1929)
- Eudonia clonodes (Meyrick, 1899)
- Eudonia colpota (Meyrick, 1888)
- Eudonia commortalis (Dyar, 1921)
- Eudonia crassiuscula (Dyar, 1929)
- Eudonia crataea (Meyrick, 1899)
- Eudonia critica (Meyrick, 1885)
- Eudonia cryerodes (Meyrick, 1899)
- Eudonia crypsinoa (Meyrick, 1885)
- Eudonia cymatias (Meyrick, 1885)
- Eudonia cyptastis (Meyrick, 1909)
- Eudonia dactyliopa (Meyrick, 1899)
- Eudonia decorella (Stainton, 1859)
- Eudonia deltophora Meyrick, 1884
- Eudonia delunella (Stainton, 1849)
- Eudonia demodes (Meyrick, 1888)
- Eudonia dinodes (Meyrick, 1885)
- Eudonia diphtheralis (Walker, [1866])
- Eudonia dochmia (Meyrick, 1905)
- Eudonia duospinata Li, Li & Nuss, 2012
- Eudonia dupla J.F.G. Clarke, 1986
- Eudonia echo (Dyar, 1929)
- Eudonia empeda (Meyrick, 1899)
- Eudonia entabeniensis Maes, 2004
- Eudonia epicremna (Meyrick, 1885)
- Eudonia epicryma (Meyrick, 1885)
- Eudonia epimystis (Meyrick, 1899)
- Eudonia erebochalca (Meyrick, 1899)
- Eudonia eremitis (Meyrick, 1885)
- Eudonia excursalis (Dyar, 1929)
- Eudonia exilis (Knaggs, 1867)
- Eudonia expallidalis (Dyar, 1906)
- Eudonia exterminata (Meyrick, 1929)
- Eudonia extincta Dyar, 1921
- Eudonia feredayi (Knaggs, 1867)
- Eudonia fogoalis Derra, 2008
- Eudonia formosa (Butler, 1881)
- Eudonia fotounii Maes, 1996
- Eudonia franciscalis Munroe, 1972
- Eudonia franclemonti Munroe, 1972
- Eudonia frigida (Butler, 1881)
- Eudonia furva Li, Li & Nuss, 2012
- Eudonia geminoflexuosa Nuss, Karsholt & Meyer, 1998
- Eudonia geraea (Meyrick, 1899)
- Eudonia gigantea Sasaki, 1998
- Eudonia gonodecta (Meyrick, 1904)
- Eudonia gracilineata Nuss, 2000
- Eudonia gressitti (Munroe, 1964)
- Eudonia griveaudi (Leraut, 1989)
- Eudonia gyrotoma (Meyrick, 1909)
- Eudonia halirrhoa (Meyrick, 1899)
- Eudonia hawaiiensis (Butler, 1881)
- Eudonia hemicycla (Meyrick, 1885)
- Eudonia hemiplaca (Meyrick, 1889)
- Eudonia heterosalis McDunnough, 1961
- Eudonia hexamera Li, Li & Nuss, 2012
- Eudonia homala (Meyrick, 1885)
- Eudonia ianthes (Meyrick, 1899)
- Eudonia idiogama (Meyrick, 1935)
- Eudonia inexoptata (Dyar, 1929)
- Eudonia inouei Sasaki, 1998
- Eudonia interlinealis (Warren, 1905)
- Eudonia ischnias (Meyrick, 1888)
- Eudonia isophaea (Meyrick, 1904)
- Eudonia ivelonensis (Leraut, 1989)
- Eudonia jucunda (Butler, 1881)
- Eudonia lacustrata (Panzer, 1804)
- Eudonia laetella (Zeller, 1846)
- Eudonia legnota (Meyrick, 1885)
- Eudonia leptalea (Meyrick, 1885)
- Eudonia leucogramma (Meyrick, 1884)
- Eudonia leucophthalma (Dyar, 1929)
- Eudonia liebmanni (Petry, 1904)
- Eudonia lijiangensis Li, Li & Nuss, 2012
- Eudonia lindbergalis Viette, 1958
- Eudonia linealis (Walker, [1866])
- Eudonia lineola (J. Curtis, 1827)
- Eudonia locularis (Meyrick, 1912)
- Eudonia loxocentra (Meyrick, 1899)
- Eudonia luminatrix (Meyrick, 1909)
- Eudonia luteusalis (Hampson, 1907)
- Eudonia lycopodiae (Swezey, 1910)
- Eudonia madagascariensis (Leraut, 1989)
- Eudonia magna Li, Li & Nuss, 2012
- Eudonia magnibursa Inoue, 1982
- Eudonia malawiensis Nuss, 2000
- Eudonia malgassicella (Marion, 1956)
- Eudonia manganeutis (Meyrick, 1885)
- Eudonia marioni (Leraut, 1989)
- Eudonia marmarias (Meyrick, 1899)
- Eudonia mawsoni (Womersley & Tindale, 1937)
- Eudonia medinella (Snellen, 1890)
- Eudonia melanaegis (Meyrick, 1885)
- Eudonia melanocephala (Meyrick, 1899)
- Eudonia melanographa (Hampson, 1907)
- Eudonia melichlora (Meyrick, 1899)
- Eudonia meliturga (Meyrick, 1905)
- Eudonia mercurella (Linnaeus, 1758)
- Eudonia meristis (Meyrick, 1899)
- Eudonia mesoleuca (Meyrick, 1888)
- Eudonia miantis (Meyrick, 1899)
- Eudonia microdontalis (Hampson, 1907)
- Eudonia microphthalma (Meyrick, 1885)
- Eudonia minima (Leraut, 1989)
- Eudonia minualis (Walker, 1866)
- Eudonia minusculalis (Walker, [1866])
- Eudonia montana (Butler, 1882)
- Eudonia munroei J.F.G. Clarke, 1986
- Eudonia murana (J.Curtis, 1827) – Scotch gray, wall grey
- Eudonia nakajimai Sasaki, 2002
- Eudonia nectarioides (Swezey, 1913)
- Eudonia notozeucta (Meyrick, 1938)
- Eudonia nyctombra (Meyrick, 1899)
- Eudonia octophora (Meyrick, 1884)
- Eudonia oculata (Philpott, 1927)
- Eudonia oenopis (Meyrick, 1899)
- Eudonia oertneri Nuss, 2007
- Eudonia officialis (Meyrick, 1929)
- Eudonia okuensis Maes, 1996
- Eudonia ombrodes (Meyrick, 1888)
- Eudonia opostactis (Meyrick, 1929)
- Eudonia oreas (Meyrick, 1885)
- Eudonia organaea (Meyrick, 1901)
- Eudonia orthioplecta (Meyrick, 1937)
- Eudonia orthoria (Meyrick, 1899)
- Eudonia owadai Sasaki, 1998
- Eudonia oxythyma (Meyrick, 1899)
- Eudonia pachyerga (Meyrick, 1927)
- Eudonia pachysema (Meyrick, 1888)
- Eudonia paghmanella Leraut, 1985
- Eudonia pallida (J.Curtis, 1827)
- Eudonia paltomacha (Meyrick, 1884)
- Eudonia parachlora (Meyrick, 1899)
- Eudonia paraequalis Nel, 2012
- Eudonia parviangusta Nuss, Karsholt & Meyer, 1998
- Eudonia passalota (Meyrick, 1899)
- Eudonia pentaspila (Meyrick, 1899)
- Eudonia perierga (Meyrick, 1885)
- Eudonia perinetensis (Leraut, 1989)
- Eudonia periphanes (Meyrick, 1885)
- Eudonia peronetis (Meyrick, 1899)
- Eudonia persimilis Sasaki, 1991
- Eudonia petrophila (Standfuss, 1848)
- Eudonia phaeoleuca (Zeller, 1846)
- Eudonia philerga (Meyrick, 1884)
- Eudonia philetaera (Meyrick, 1885)
- Eudonia philorphna (Meyrick, 1929)
- Eudonia piroformis (Amsel, 1949)
- Eudonia platyscia (Meyrick, 1899)
- Eudonia pongalis (C. Felder, R. Felder & Rogenhofer, 1875)
- Eudonia probolaea (Meyrick, 1899) (including E. omichlopis)
- Eudonia promiscua (Wileman & South, 1919)
- Eudonia protorthra (Meyrick, 1885)
- Eudonia psammitis (Meyrick, 1885)
- Eudonia psednopa (Meyrick, 1929)
- Eudonia puellaris Sasaki, 1991
- Eudonia pygmina Leraut, 1988
- Eudonia quaestoria (Meyrick, 1929)
- Eudonia rakaiensis (Knaggs, 1867)
- Eudonia rectilinea (Zeller, 1874)
- Eudonia rectilineata Li, Li & Nuss, 2012
- Eudonia religiosa (Meyrick, 1904)
- Eudonia rhombias (Meyrick, 1899)
- Eudonia rotundalis Munroe, 1972
- Eudonia sabulosella (Walker, 1863)
- Eudonia schwarzalis (Dyar, 1906)
- Eudonia scoriella (T.V. Wollaston, 1858)
- Eudonia senecaensis Huemer & Leraut, 1993
- Eudonia shafferi Nuss, Karsholt & Meyer, 1998
- Eudonia siderina (Meyrick, 1899)
- Eudonia singulannulata Li, Li & Nuss, 2012
- Eudonia sogai (Leraut, 1989)
- Eudonia spaldingalis (Barnes & McDunnough, 1912)
- Eudonia spectacularis (Meyrick, 1929)
- Eudonia speideli Leraut, 1982
- Eudonia spenceri Munroe, 1972
- Eudonia stenota (T.V. Wollaston, 1858)
- Eudonia steropaea (Meyrick, 1884
- Eudonia strigalis (Dyar, 1906)
- Eudonia struthias (Meyrick, 1899)
- Eudonia subditella (Walker, 1866)
- Eudonia submarginalis (Walker, 1863)
- Eudonia sudetica (Zeller, 1839)
- Eudonia synapta (Meyrick, 1885)
- Eudonia taiwanalpina Sasaki, 1998
- Eudonia tetranesa (Meyrick, 1899)
- Eudonia thalamias (Meyrick, 1899)
- Eudonia thomealis (Viette, 1957)
- Eudonia threnodes (Meyrick, 1887)
- Eudonia thyellopis (Meyrick, 1899)
- Eudonia thyridias (Meyrick, 1905)
- Eudonia tibetalis (Caradja in Caradja & Meyrick, 1937)
- Eudonia tivira (J.F.G. Clarke, 1971)
- Eudonia torniplagalis (Dyar, 1904)
- Eudonia torodes (Meyrick, 1901)
- Eudonia triacma (Meyrick, 1899)
- Eudonia triclera (Meyrick, 1905)
- Eudonia trivirgatus (C. Felder, R. Felder & Rogenhofer, 1875)
- Eudonia truncicolella (Stainton, 1849)
- Eudonia tyraula (Meyrick, 1899)
- Eudonia tyrophanta (Meyrick, 1932)
- Eudonia umbrosa Sasaki, 1998
- Eudonia ustiramis (Meyrick, 1931)
- Eudonia vallesialis (Duponchel, 1832)
- Eudonia venosa (Butler, 1881)
- Eudonia viettei (Leraut, 1989)
- Eudonia vinasalis (Dyar, 1929)
- Eudonia vivida Munroe, 1972
- Eudonia wolongensis Li, Li & Nuss, 2012
- Eudonia xysmatias (Meyrick, 1907)
- Eudonia yaoundeiensis Maes, 1996
- Eudonia ycarda (Dyar, 1929)
- Eudonia zhongdianensis Li, Li & Nuss, 2012
- Eudonia zophochlaena (Meyrick, 1923)
- Eudonia zophochlora (Meyrick, 1899)
