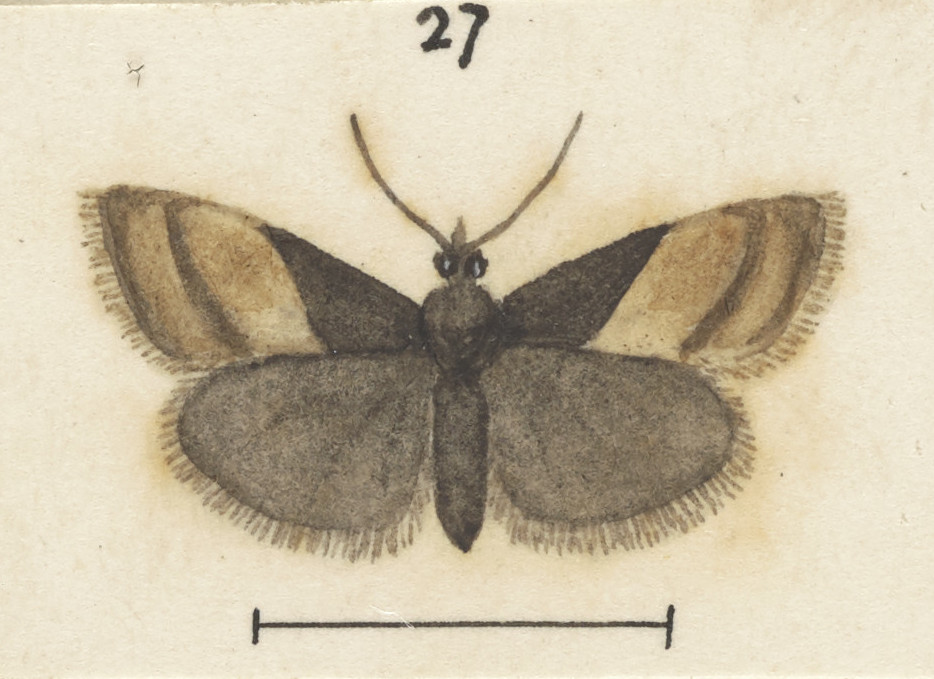

Scientific classification
- Kingdom: Animalia
- Phylum: Arthropoda
- Class: Insecta
- Order: Lepidoptera
- Family: Crambidae
- Genus: Eudonia
- Species: E. triclera

Binomial name
- Eudonia triclera (Meyrick, 1905)

Synonyms
- Scoparia triclera Meyrick, 1905

= Eudonia triclera =

Species of moth

Eudonia triclera is a moth in the family Crambidae. It was described by Edward Meyrick in 1905. It is endemic to New Zealand.

The wingspan is about 12 mm (0.47 in). The forewings are blackish-fuscous mixed with whitish. There is a small pale ochreous elongated subbasal spot in the middle and a broad ochreous-white postmedian band parallel to the termen. The subterminal line is whitish. The hindwings are dark fuscous.
