= Eudonia paghmanella =

Scientific classification
- Kingdom: Animalia
- Phylum: Arthropoda
- Class: Insecta
- Order: Lepidoptera
- Family: Crambidae
- Genus: Eudonia
- Species: E. paghmanella

Binomial name
- Eudonia paghmanella Leraut, 1985

Species of moth

Eudonia paghmanella is a moth in the family Crambidae. It was described by Patrice J.A. Leraut in 1985. It is found in Afghanistan.
