= Eudonia aeolias =

Scientific classification
- Kingdom: Animalia
- Phylum: Arthropoda
- Class: Insecta
- Order: Lepidoptera
- Family: Crambidae
- Genus: Eudonia
- Species: E. aeolias

Binomial name
- Eudonia aeolias (Meyrick, 1899)

Synonyms
- Scoparia aeolias Meyrick, 1899

Species of moth

Eudonia aeolias is a moth of the family Crambidae. It is endemic to the Hawaiian island of Oahu.
