= Eudonia oertneri =

Scientific classification
- Kingdom: Animalia
- Phylum: Arthropoda
- Clade: Pancrustacea
- Class: Insecta
- Order: Lepidoptera
- Family: Crambidae
- Genus: Eudonia
- Species: E. oertneri

Binomial name
- Eudonia oertneri Nuss, 2007

Species of moth

Eudonia oertneri is a moth in the family Crambidae. It was described by Nuss in 2007. It is found in Kyrgyzstan.
