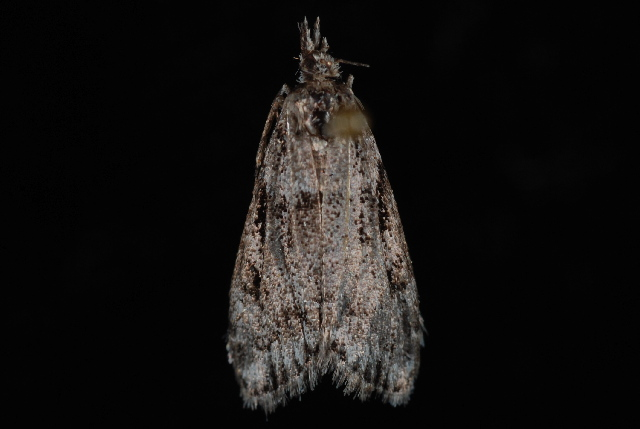

Scientific classification
- Kingdom: Animalia
- Phylum: Arthropoda
- Class: Insecta
- Order: Lepidoptera
- Family: Crambidae
- Genus: Eudonia
- Species: E. vivida

Binomial name
- Eudonia vivida Munroe, 1972

= Eudonia vivida =

Species of moth

Eudonia vivida is a species of moth in the family Crambidae. It was first described by Eugene G. Munroe in 1972. It is found in North America, where it has been recorded from Alberta, British Columbia, Maine, New Hampshire, Nova Scotia and Quebec.
