= Eudonia ycarda =

Scientific classification
- Kingdom: Animalia
- Phylum: Arthropoda
- Class: Insecta
- Order: Lepidoptera
- Family: Crambidae
- Genus: Eudonia
- Species: E. ycarda

Binomial name
- Eudonia ycarda (Dyar, 1929)

Synonyms
- Scoparia ycarda Dyar, 1929

Species of moth

Eudonia ycarda is a moth in the family Crambidae. It was described by Harrison Gray Dyar Jr. in 1929. It is found in Guatemala and Orizaba, Mexico.

The wingspan is 10–13 mm. The forewings are grey, with white lines. The inner line followed by a moderate black shade. The terminal area is dark, with only traces of a pale sinuate subterminal line. Adults have been recorded on wing in July and November.
