= Eudonia piroformis =

Scientific classification
- Kingdom: Animalia
- Phylum: Arthropoda
- Class: Insecta
- Order: Lepidoptera
- Family: Crambidae
- Genus: Eudonia
- Species: E. piroformis

Binomial name
- Eudonia piroformis (Amsel, 1949)

Synonyms
- Scoparia piroformis Amsel, 1949

Species of moth

Eudonia piroformis is a moth in the family Crambidae. It was described by Hans Georg Amsel in 1949. It is found in Iraq.
