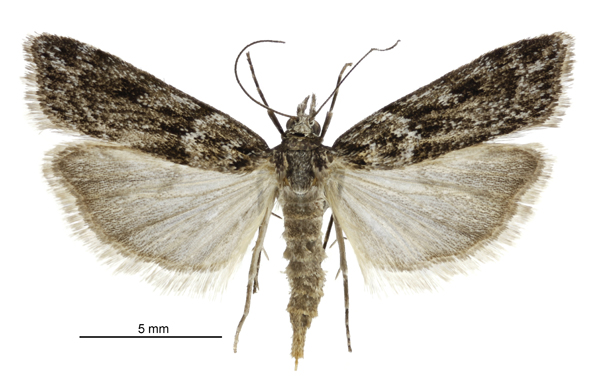
- Female
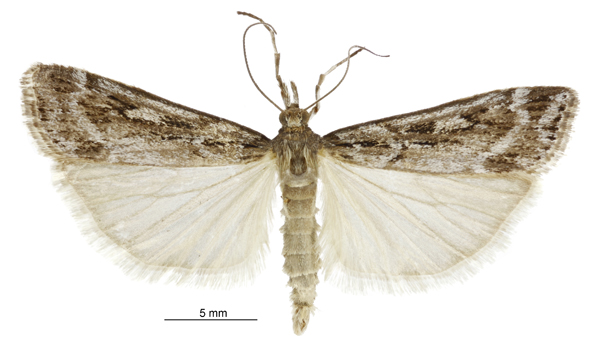
- Male

Scientific classification
- Kingdom: Animalia
- Phylum: Arthropoda
- Class: Insecta
- Order: Lepidoptera
- Family: Crambidae
- Genus: Eudonia
- Species: E. cyptastis

Binomial name
- Eudonia cyptastis (Meyrick, 1909)

Synonyms
- Scoparia cyptastis Meyrick, 1909

= Eudonia cyptastis =

Species of moth

Eudonia cyptastis is a moth in the family Crambidae. It was described by Edward Meyrick in 1909. This species is endemic to New Zealand.

The wingspan is 17–20 mm. The forewings are fuscous, variably mixed or suffused with whitish. The hindwings are pale whitish-fuscous, with a faint yellowish tinge. The termen is suffused with fuscous. Adults have been recorded on wing in November.
