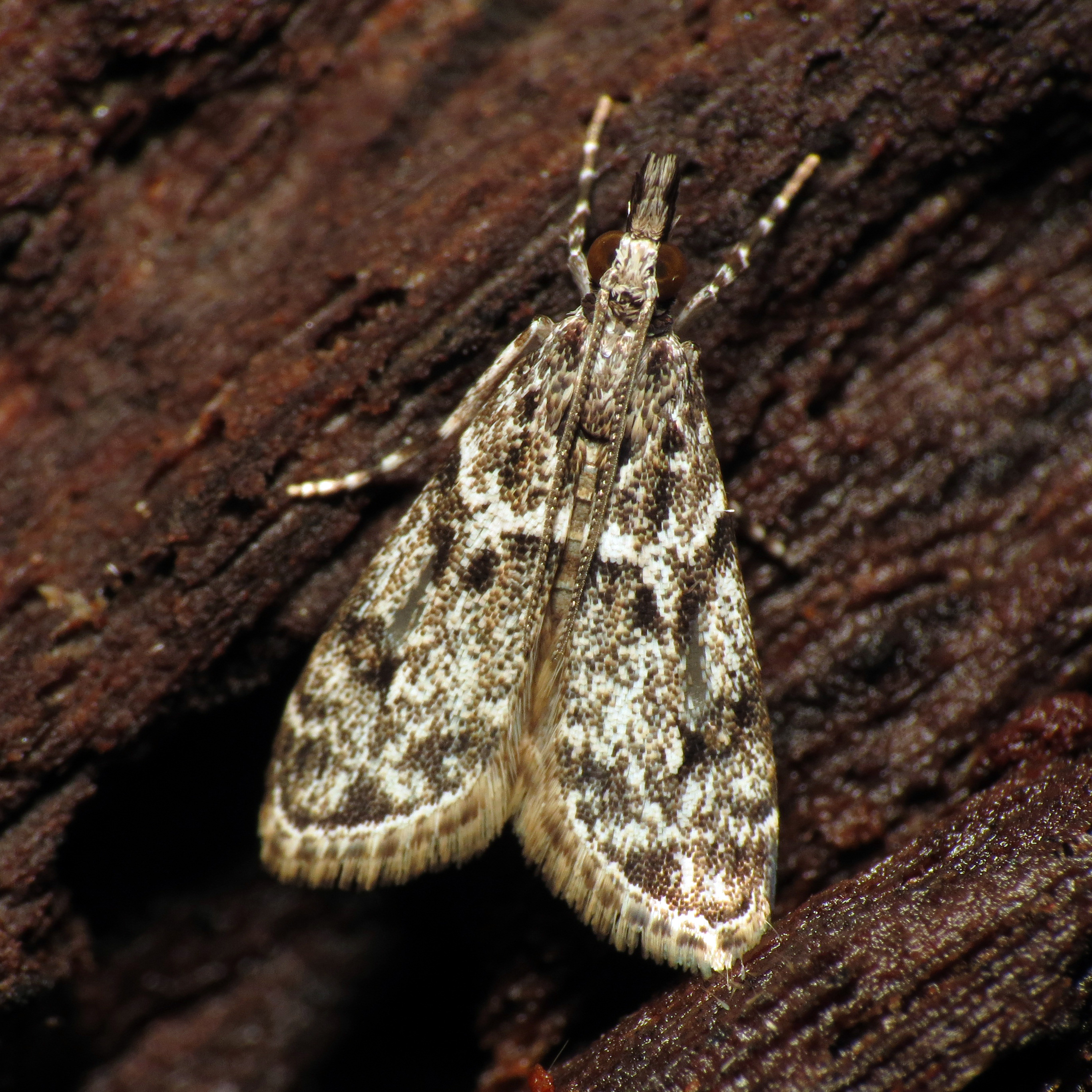
- Eudonia heterosalis. Rock Creek Park, Washington, DC, USA.

Scientific classification
- Kingdom: Animalia
- Phylum: Arthropoda
- Class: Insecta
- Order: Lepidoptera
- Family: Crambidae
- Genus: Eudonia
- Species: E. heterosalis

Binomial name
- Eudonia heterosalis (McDunnough, 1961)

Synonyms
- Eudoria heterosalis McDunnough, 1961

= Eudonia heterosalis =

Species of moth

Eudonia heterosalis is a moth in the family Crambidae. It was described by James Halliday McDunnough in 1961. It is found in North America, where it has been recorded from Nova Scotia to Ontario and southern Quebec, south to Louisiana and Florida.

The wingspan is about 13 mm. Adults have been recorded on wing from February to November.
