= Eudonia schwarzalis =

Scientific classification
- Kingdom: Animalia
- Phylum: Arthropoda
- Class: Insecta
- Order: Lepidoptera
- Family: Crambidae
- Genus: Eudonia
- Species: E. schwarzalis

Binomial name
- Eudonia schwarzalis (Dyar, 1906)

Synonyms
- Scoparia schwarzalis Dyar, 1906

Species of moth

Eudonia schwarzalis is a moth in the family Crambidae. It was described by Harrison Gray Dyar Jr. in 1906. It is found in North America, where it has been recorded from Arizona.

The wingspan is about 16 mm (0.63 in). The forewings are light gray, with a dark base and a dark shade beyond the pale inner line, enclosing a quadrate black reniform spot. The hindwings are pale gray. Adults have been recorded on wing in May.
