= Eudonia persimilis =

Scientific classification
- Kingdom: Animalia
- Phylum: Arthropoda
- Class: Insecta
- Order: Lepidoptera
- Family: Crambidae
- Genus: Eudonia
- Species: E. persimilis

Binomial name
- Eudonia persimilis Sasaki, 1991

Species of moth

Eudonia persimilis is a moth in the family Crambidae. It was described by Sasaki in 1991. It is found in Japan (Honshu), China (Heilongjiang, Guangxi, Shaanxi), Taiwan and Russia.
