= Eudonia apicifusca =

Scientific classification
- Kingdom: Animalia
- Phylum: Arthropoda
- Class: Insecta
- Order: Lepidoptera
- Family: Crambidae
- Genus: Eudonia
- Species: E. apicifusca

Binomial name
- Eudonia apicifusca Sasaki, 1999

Species of moth

Eudonia apicifusca is a moth in the family Crambidae. It was described by Sasaki in 1999. It is found in Taiwan.
