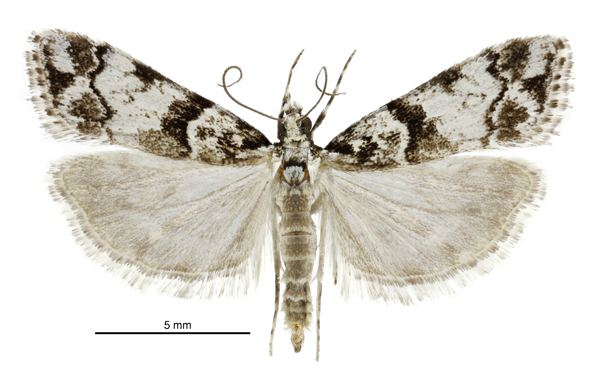
- Male

Scientific classification
- Kingdom: Animalia
- Phylum: Arthropoda
- Clade: Pancrustacea
- Class: Insecta
- Order: Lepidoptera
- Family: Crambidae
- Genus: Eudonia
- Species: E. torodes

Binomial name
- Eudonia torodes (Meyrick, 1901)

Synonyms
- Scoparia torodes Meyrick, 1901; Scoparia galactilis Hudson, 1913

= Eudonia torodes =

Species of moth

Eudonia torodes is a moth in the family Crambidae. It was first described by Edward Meyrick in 1901. It is endemic to New Zealand.

== Taxonomy ==
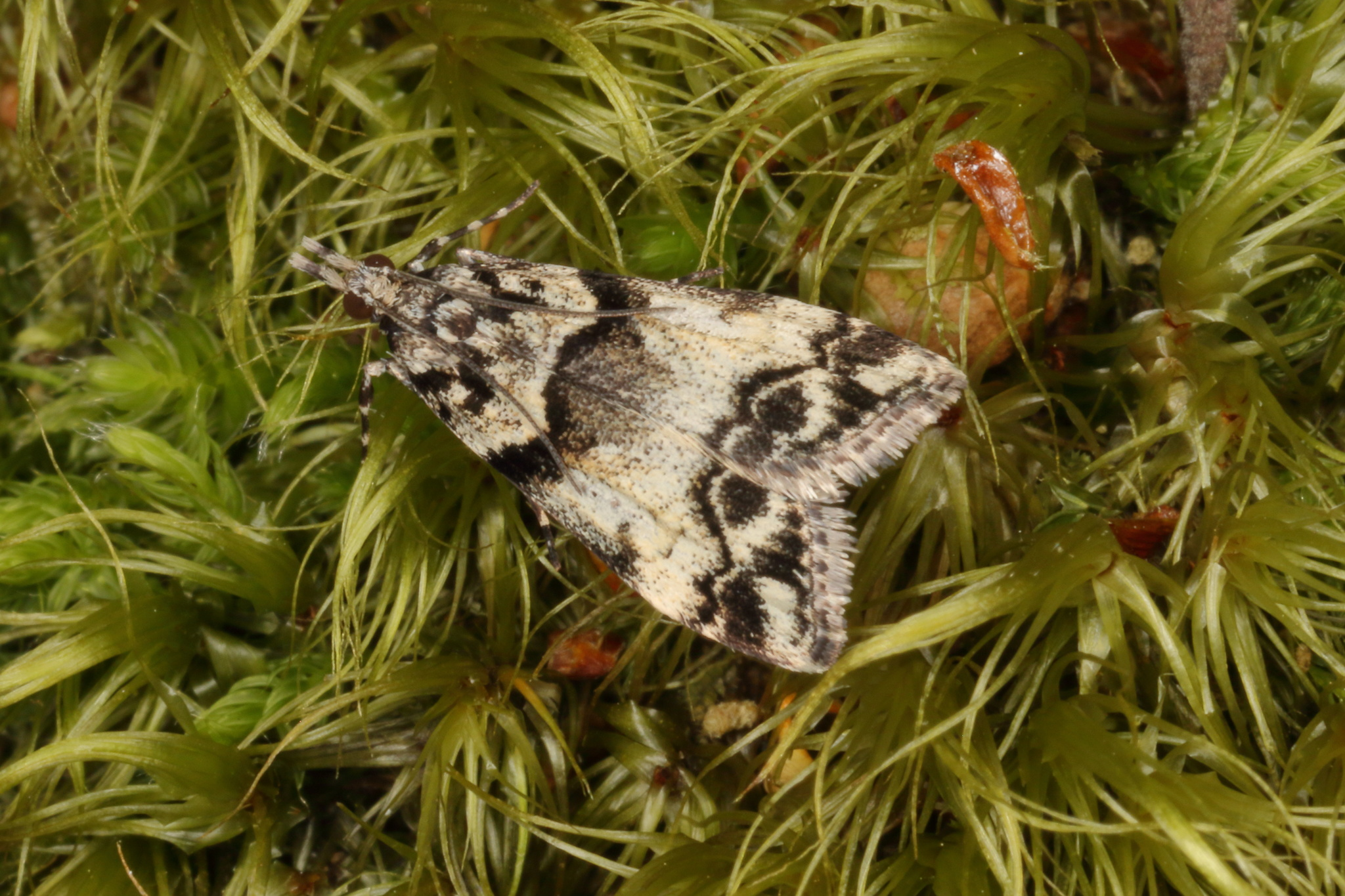
Eudonia torodes

This species was first described in 1901 by Edward Meyrick and originally named Scoparia torodes. In 1913, thinking he was describing a new species, George Hudson named this species Scoparia galactilis. This name was synonymised by Hudson in 1939. In 1988 John S. Dugdale placed this species in the genus Eudonia.

== Distribution ==
This species is endemic to New Zealand.
