= Eudonia yaoundeiensis =

Scientific classification
- Kingdom: Animalia
- Phylum: Arthropoda
- Class: Insecta
- Order: Lepidoptera
- Family: Crambidae
- Genus: Eudonia
- Species: E. yaoundeiensis

Binomial name
- Eudonia yaoundeiensis Maes, 1996

Species of moth

Eudonia yaoundeiensis is a moth in the family Crambidae. It was described by Koen V. N. Maes in 1996. It is found in Cameroon.
