= Eudonia perierga =

Scientific classification
- Kingdom: Animalia
- Phylum: Arthropoda
- Class: Insecta
- Order: Lepidoptera
- Family: Crambidae
- Genus: Eudonia
- Species: E. perierga

Binomial name
- Eudonia perierga (Meyrick, 1885)

Synonyms
- Scoparia perierga Meyrick, 1885

Species of moth

Eudonia perierga is a moth in the family Crambidae. It was described by Edward Meyrick in 1885. It is found in Australia, where it has been recorded from Tasmania.

The wingspan is 14–15 mm. The forewings are white, suffused with light greyish fuscous or yellowish fuscous, and irregularly irrorated (sprinkled) with black. There is a short thick interrupted cloudy blackish streak from the base of the costa. The first line is whitish, margined by triangular black spots posteriorly on the costa and inner margin. The second line is white, anteriorly dark-margined. The hindwings are whitish grey suffused with darker, the apex and upper part of the hindmargin suffused with dark fuscous. Adults have been recorded on wing in December.
