= Eudonia senecaensis =

Scientific classification
- Kingdom: Animalia
- Phylum: Arthropoda
- Clade: Pancrustacea
- Class: Insecta
- Order: Lepidoptera
- Family: Crambidae
- Genus: Eudonia
- Species: E. senecaensis

Binomial name
- Eudonia senecaensis Huemer & Leraut, 1993

Species of moth

Eudonia senecaensis is a species of moth in the family Crambidae. It is found in France.
