= Eudonia extincta =

Scientific classification
- Kingdom: Animalia
- Phylum: Arthropoda
- Class: Insecta
- Order: Lepidoptera
- Family: Crambidae
- Genus: Eudonia
- Species: E. extincta

Binomial name
- Eudonia extincta (Dyar, 1921)

Synonyms
- Scoparia extincta Dyar, 1921

Species of moth

Eudonia extincta is a moth in the family Crambidae. It was described by Harrison Gray Dyar Jr. in 1921. It is found in the Distrito Federal of Mexico.

The wingspan is about 21 mm. The forewings are uniform shining brownish grey. There are two small black dots at the end of the cell and a third beyond these. The outer line is pale and diffuse. It is followed by a broad ill-defined darker shade. There are black terminal dots at the ends of the veins. The hindwings are sordid whitish. Adults have been recorded on wing in August.
