= Eudonia marmarias =

Scientific classification
- Kingdom: Animalia
- Phylum: Arthropoda
- Class: Insecta
- Order: Lepidoptera
- Family: Crambidae
- Genus: Eudonia
- Species: E. marmarias

Binomial name
- Eudonia marmarias (Meyrick, 1899)

Synonyms
- Scoparia marmarias Meyrick, 1899

Species of moth

Eudonia marmarias is a moth of the family Crambidae. It is endemic to the Hawaiian islands of Oahu, Molokai, Maui and Hawaii.
