= Eudonia dactyliopa =

Scientific classification
- Kingdom: Animalia
- Phylum: Arthropoda
- Class: Insecta
- Order: Lepidoptera
- Family: Crambidae
- Genus: Eudonia
- Species: E. dactyliopa

Binomial name
- Eudonia dactyliopa (Meyrick, 1899)

Synonyms
- Scoparia dactyliopa Meyrick, 1899

Species of moth

Eudonia dactyliopa is a moth of the family Crambidae. It is endemic to the Hawaiian islands of Oahu and Molokai. The larvae feed on moss.
