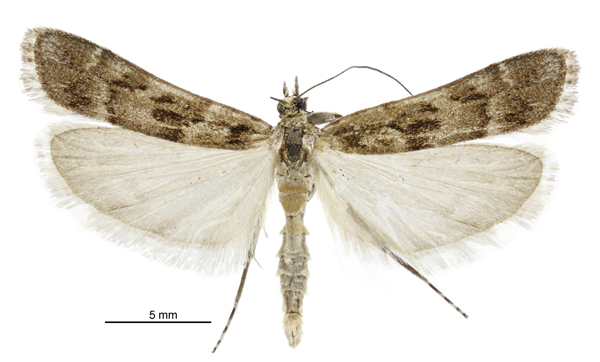
- Male

Scientific classification
- Kingdom: Animalia
- Phylum: Arthropoda
- Clade: Pancrustacea
- Class: Insecta
- Order: Lepidoptera
- Family: Crambidae
- Genus: Eudonia
- Species: E. gyrotoma

Binomial name
- Eudonia gyrotoma (Meyrick, 1909)

Synonyms
- Scoparia gyrotoma Meyrick, 1909; Scoparia repercussa Philpott, 1929

= Eudonia gyrotoma =

Species of moth

Eudonia gyrotoma is a moth in the family Crambidae. It was described by Edward Meyrick in 1909. The species is endemic to New Zealand.

The wingspan is about 20 mm. The forewings are light brassy-yellowish-fuscous, irrorated with white and sprinkled with dark fuscous. The hindwings are grey-whitish, the costa and termen suffused with light grey.
