= Eudonia microdontalis =

Scientific classification
- Kingdom: Animalia
- Phylum: Arthropoda
- Class: Insecta
- Order: Lepidoptera
- Family: Crambidae
- Genus: Eudonia
- Species: E. microdontalis

Binomial name
- Eudonia microdontalis (Hampson, 1907)

Synonyms
- Scoparia microdontalis Hampson, 1907

Species of moth

Eudonia microdontalis is a moth in the family Crambidae. It was described by George Hampson in 1907. It is found in Japan, China (Gansu, Hubei, Hunan, Zhejiang) and Russia.

The wingspan is 16–22 mm. The forewings are white tinged with brown and irrorated with black. The antemedial line is double and filled with white. The hindwings are white, tinged with brown.
