= Eudonia mesoleuca =

Scientific classification
- Kingdom: Animalia
- Phylum: Arthropoda
- Class: Insecta
- Order: Lepidoptera
- Family: Crambidae
- Genus: Eudonia
- Species: E. mesoleuca

Binomial name
- Eudonia mesoleuca (Meyrick, 1888)

Synonyms
- Xeroscopa mesoleuca Meyrick, 1888; Scoparia mesoleuca

Species of moth

Eudonia mesoleuca is a moth of the family Crambidae. It is endemic to the Hawaiian island of Oahu.

The larvae have been reared from dead branches.
