= Eudonia lindbergalis =

Scientific classification
- Kingdom: Animalia
- Phylum: Arthropoda
- Class: Insecta
- Order: Lepidoptera
- Family: Crambidae
- Genus: Eudonia
- Species: E. lindbergalis

Binomial name
- Eudonia lindbergalis Viette, 1958

Species of moth

Eudonia lindbergalis is a moth in the family Crambidae. It was described by Viette in 1958. It is found in Cape Verde.
