= Eudonia actias =

Scientific classification
- Kingdom: Animalia
- Phylum: Arthropoda
- Class: Insecta
- Order: Lepidoptera
- Family: Crambidae
- Genus: Eudonia
- Species: E. actias

Binomial name
- Eudonia actias (Meyrick, 1899)

Synonyms
- Scoparia actias Meyrick, 1899

Species of moth

Eudonia actias is a moth of the family Crambidae. It is endemic to the island of Hawaii.
