= Eudonia tibetalis =

Scientific classification
- Kingdom: Animalia
- Phylum: Arthropoda
- Class: Insecta
- Order: Lepidoptera
- Family: Crambidae
- Genus: Eudonia
- Species: E. tibetalis

Binomial name
- Eudonia tibetalis (Caradja in Caradja & Meyrick, 1937)

Synonyms
- Scoparia tibetalis Caradja in Caradja & Meyrick, 1937; Eudonia altissima P. Leraut, 1986

Species of moth

Eudonia tibetalis is a moth in the family Crambidae. It was described by Aristide Caradja in 1937. It is found in the Chinese provinces of Qinghai, Sichuan and Yunnan.
