= Eudonia oenopis =

Scientific classification
- Kingdom: Animalia
- Phylum: Arthropoda
- Class: Insecta
- Order: Lepidoptera
- Family: Crambidae
- Genus: Eudonia
- Species: E. oenopis

Binomial name
- Eudonia oenopis (Meyrick, 1899)

Synonyms
- Scoparia oenopis Meyrick, 1899; Scoparia gymnopis Meyrick, 1904

Species of moth

Eudonia oenopis is a moth of the family Crambidae. It is endemic to the Hawaiian islands of Molokai, Maui and Hawaii.
