= Eudonia nectarioides =

Scientific classification
- Kingdom: Animalia
- Phylum: Arthropoda
- Class: Insecta
- Order: Lepidoptera
- Family: Crambidae
- Genus: Eudonia
- Species: E. nectarioides

Binomial name
- Eudonia nectarioides (Swezey, 1913)

Synonyms
- Scoparia nectarioides Swezey, 1913

Species of moth

Eudonia nectarioides is a moth of the family Crambidae described by Otto Herman Swezey in 1913. It is endemic to the island of Hawaii.
