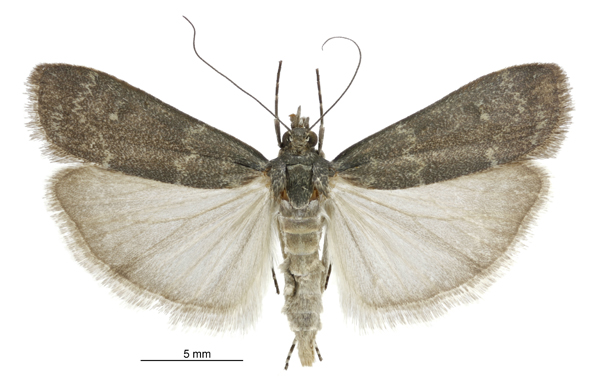
- Female
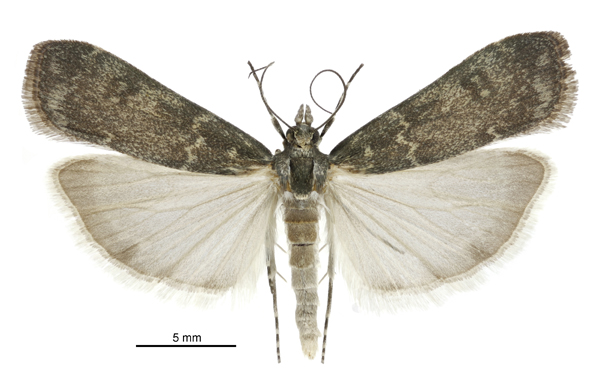
- Male

Scientific classification
- Kingdom: Animalia
- Phylum: Arthropoda
- Class: Insecta
- Order: Lepidoptera
- Family: Crambidae
- Genus: Eudonia
- Species: E. cataxesta

Binomial name
- Eudonia cataxesta (Meyrick, 1884)

Synonyms
- Scoparia cataxesta Meyrick, 1884

= Eudonia cataxesta =

Species of moth

Eudonia cataxesta is a moth in the family Crambidae. It was described by Edward Meyrick in 1884. It is endemic to New Zealand.

== Description ==
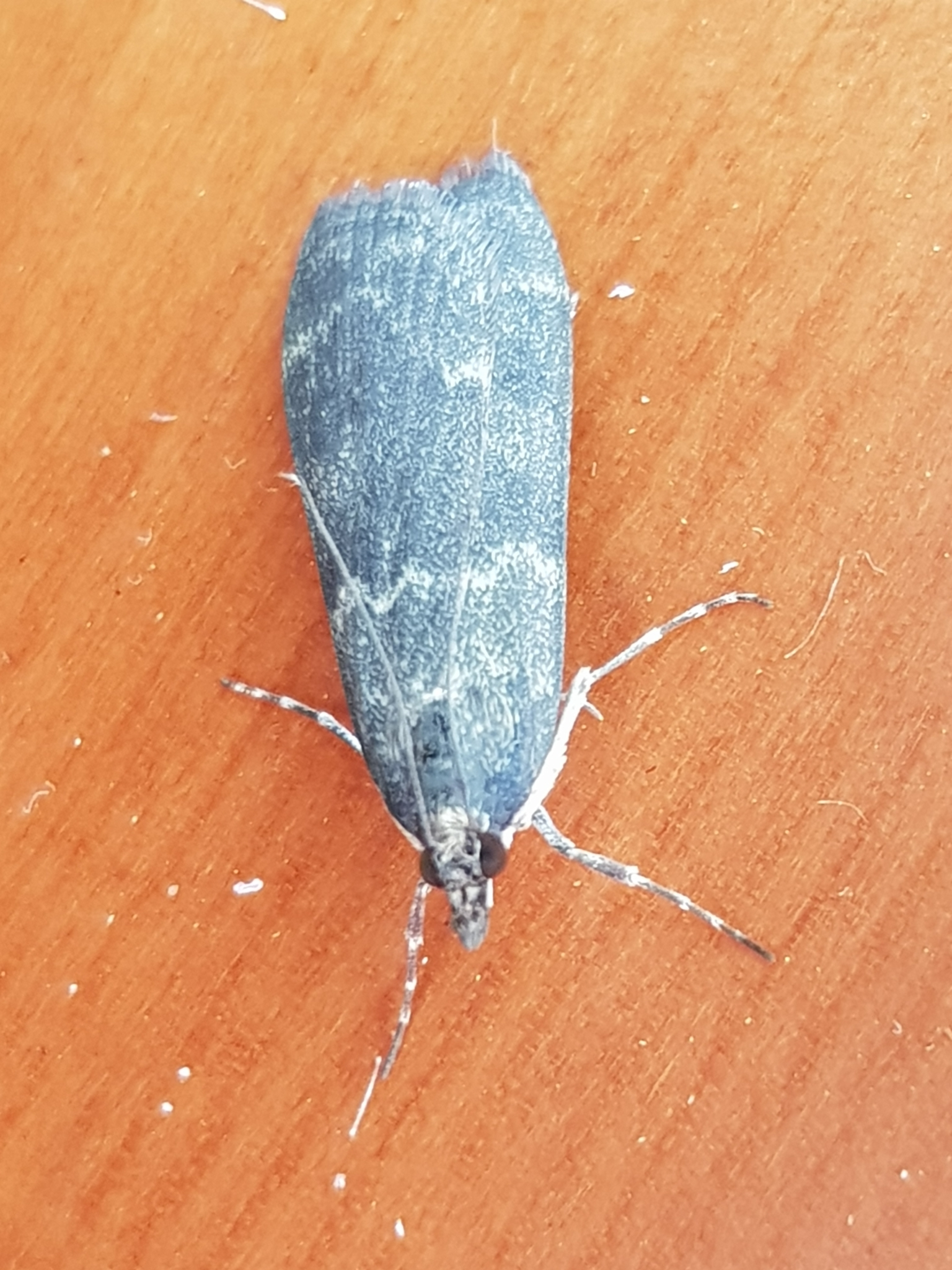
Eudonia cataxesta

The wingspan is 23–27 mm. The forewings are dark slaty-grey, with an indigo-bluish tinge and with fine scattered grey-whitish scales. The hindwings are whitish-grey with a darker grey hindmarginal band. Adults have been recorded on wing in January and February.

== Host species ==
The caterpillars of this species are associated with mosses. Adult moths probably feed on the flowers of Helichrysum intermedium.
