= Eudonia ischnias =

Scientific classification
- Kingdom: Animalia
- Phylum: Arthropoda
- Class: Insecta
- Order: Lepidoptera
- Family: Crambidae
- Genus: Eudonia
- Species: E. ischnias

Binomial name
- Eudonia ischnias (Meyrick, 1888)

Synonyms
- Scoparia ischnias; Xeroscopa ischnias Meyrick, 1888

Species of moth

Eudonia ischnias is a moth of the family Crambidae. It is endemic to the Hawaiian island of Maui.
