= Eudonia abrupta =

Scientific classification
- Kingdom: Animalia
- Phylum: Arthropoda
- Class: Insecta
- Order: Lepidoptera
- Family: Crambidae
- Genus: Eudonia
- Species: E. abrupta

Binomial name
- Eudonia abrupta W.-C. Li, 2012

Species of moth

Eudonia abrupta is a moth in the family Crambidae. It was described by Wei-Chun Li in 2012. It is found in Jiangxi, China.
