= Eudonia torniplagalis =

Scientific classification
- Kingdom: Animalia
- Phylum: Arthropoda
- Class: Insecta
- Order: Lepidoptera
- Family: Crambidae
- Genus: Eudonia
- Species: E. torniplagalis

Binomial name
- Eudonia torniplagalis (Dyar, 1904)

Synonyms
- Scoparia torniplagalis Dyar, 1904; Scoparia alialis Barnes & McDunnough, 1912

Species of moth

Eudonia torniplagalis is a moth in the family Crambidae. It was described by Harrison Gray Dyar Jr. in 1904. It is found in North America, where it has been recorded from South Dakota, the Rocky Mountains, the mountains of the south-western United States and from British Columbia to southern California.

== Subspecies ==
- Eudonia torniplagalis torniplagalis (British Columbia, Vancouver Island, Washington)
- Eudonia torniplagalis alialis (Barnes & McDunnough, 1912) (South Dakota, Wyoming, Utah, Colorado, Arizona, New Mexico)
- Eudonia torniplagalis perfectalis Munroe, 1972 (California)
