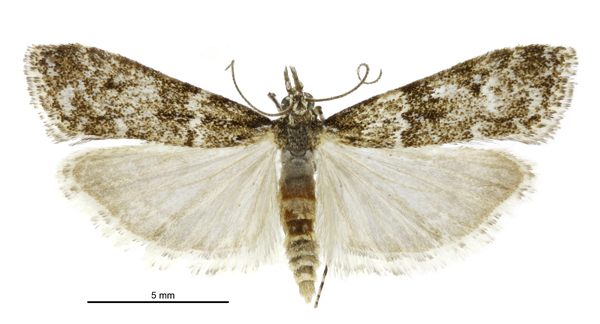

Scientific classification
- Kingdom: Animalia
- Phylum: Arthropoda
- Class: Insecta
- Order: Lepidoptera
- Family: Crambidae
- Genus: Eudonia
- Species: E. manganeutis

Binomial name
- Eudonia manganeutis (Meyrick, 1884)

Synonyms
- Scoparia manganeutis Meyrick, 1885

= Eudonia manganeutis =

Species of moth

Eudonia manganeutis is a moth in the family Crambidae. It was named by Edward Meyrick in 1884. It is endemic to New Zealand.

The wingspan is 17–18 mm. The forewings are light grey, mixed with white and irrorated with black. The first line is white, margined by dark posteriorly. The second line is whitish and also dark-margined. The hindwings are whitish-grey with a grey hindmargin. Adults have been recorded on wing in January.

The larvae of this species feed on mosses.
