= Eudonia malawiensis =

Scientific classification
- Kingdom: Animalia
- Phylum: Arthropoda
- Clade: Pancrustacea
- Class: Insecta
- Order: Lepidoptera
- Family: Crambidae
- Genus: Eudonia
- Species: E. malawiensis

Binomial name
- Eudonia malawiensis Nuss, 2000

Species of moth

Eudonia malawiensis is a moth in the family Crambidae. It was described by Nuss in 2000. It is found in Malawi.
