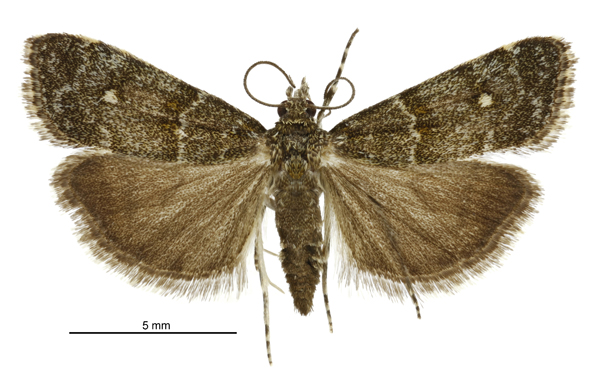
- Male
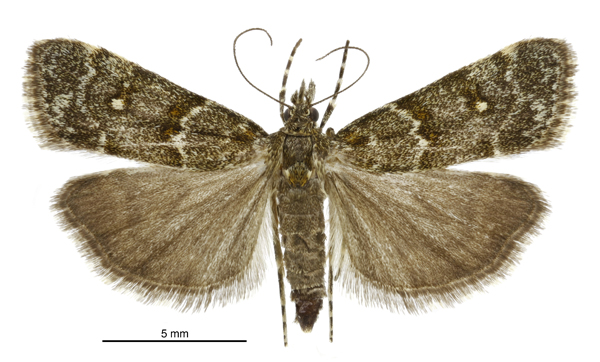
- Female

Scientific classification
- Kingdom: Animalia
- Phylum: Arthropoda
- Class: Insecta
- Order: Lepidoptera
- Family: Crambidae
- Genus: Eudonia
- Species: E. microphthalma

Binomial name
- Eudonia microphthalma (Meyrick, 1885)

Synonyms
- Scoparia microphthalma Meyrick, 1885

= Eudonia microphthalma =

Species of moth

Eudonia microphthalma is a moth in the family Crambidae. It was described by Edward Meyrick in 1884. It is endemic to New Zealand.

The wingspan is 15–16 mm. The forewings are blackish, irrorated with white. There is a small ochreous-yellow spot near the base, followed by a faint whitish transverse line. Both the first and second line are whitish, margined by dark. The hindwings are fuscous-grey, becoming darker posteriorly. Adults have been recorded on wing in December.
