= Eudonia bucolica =

Scientific classification
- Kingdom: Animalia
- Phylum: Arthropoda
- Class: Insecta
- Order: Lepidoptera
- Family: Crambidae
- Genus: Eudonia
- Species: E. bucolica

Binomial name
- Eudonia bucolica (Meyrick, 1899)

Synonyms
- Scoparia bucolica Meyrick, 1899; Scoparia macrophanes Meyrick, 1888; Scoparia pyrseutis Meyrick, 1899

Species of moth

Eudonia bucolica is a moth of the family Crambidae. It is endemic to the Hawaiian islands of Oahu, Molokai, Maui and Hawaii.

The wingspan is 17–21 mm.

The larvae of ssp. bucolica have been recorded feeding on moss.

== Subspecies ==
- Eudonia bucolica bucolica (Oahu, Molokai)
- Eudonia bucolica macrophanes Meyrick, 1888 (Maui)
- Eudonia bucolica pyrseutis Meyrick, 1899 (Hawaii)
