= Eudonia platyscia =

Scientific classification
- Kingdom: Animalia
- Phylum: Arthropoda
- Class: Insecta
- Order: Lepidoptera
- Family: Crambidae
- Genus: Eudonia
- Species: E. platyscia

Binomial name
- Eudonia platyscia (Meyrick, 1899)

Synonyms
- Scoparia platyscia Meyrick, 1899

Species of moth

Eudonia platyscia is a moth of the family Crambidae. It is endemic to the Hawaiian islands of Kauai, Molokai and Hawaii.
