= Eudonia madagascariensis =

Scientific classification
- Kingdom: Animalia
- Phylum: Arthropoda
- Class: Insecta
- Order: Lepidoptera
- Family: Crambidae
- Genus: Eudonia
- Species: E. madagascariensis

Binomial name
- Eudonia madagascariensis (Leraut, 1989)

Synonyms
- Witlesia madagascariensis Leraut, 1989

Species of moth

Eudonia madagascariensis is a moth in the family Crambidae. It was described by Patrice J.A. Leraut in 1989. It is found in Madagascar.
