= Eudonia parviangusta =

Scientific classification
- Kingdom: Animalia
- Phylum: Arthropoda
- Clade: Pancrustacea
- Class: Insecta
- Order: Lepidoptera
- Family: Crambidae
- Genus: Eudonia
- Species: E. parviangusta

Binomial name
- Eudonia parviangusta Nuss, Karsholt & Meyer, 1998

Species of moth

Eudonia parviangusta is a species of moth in the family Crambidae. It is found on the Canary Islands.
