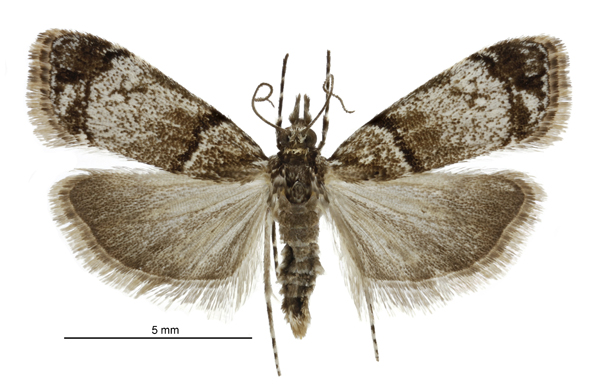
- Female
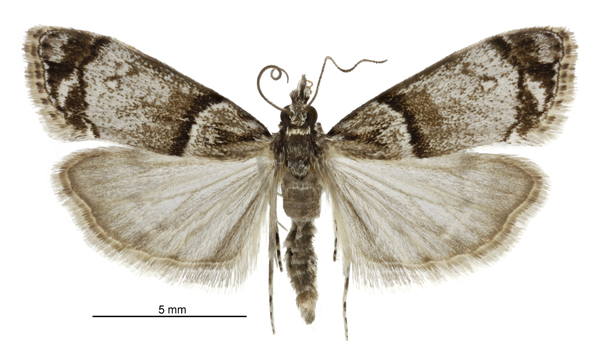
- Male

Scientific classification
- Kingdom: Animalia
- Phylum: Arthropoda
- Class: Insecta
- Order: Lepidoptera
- Family: Crambidae
- Genus: Eudonia
- Species: E. choristis

Binomial name
- Eudonia choristis (Meyrick, 1907)

Synonyms
- Scoparia choristis Meyrick, 1907

= Eudonia choristis =

Species of moth

Eudonia choristis is a moth in the family Crambidae. It was described by Edward Meyrick in 1907. It is endemic to New Zealand.

The wingspan is about 17 mm. The forewings are white, sprinkled with fuscous. The base is suffused with fuscous, with a few black scales. The hindwings are light grey with brassy reflections. They are paler towards the base. Adults have been recorded on wing in November.
