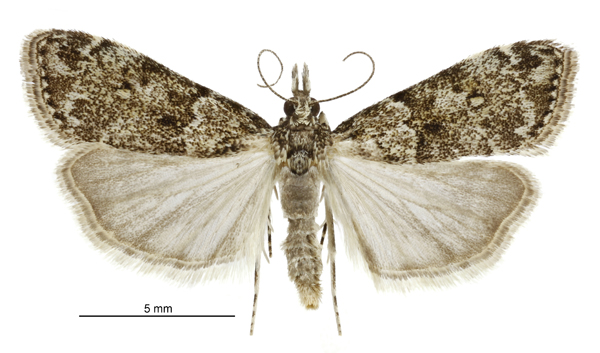
- Female

Scientific classification
- Kingdom: Animalia
- Phylum: Arthropoda
- Class: Insecta
- Order: Lepidoptera
- Family: Crambidae
- Genus: Eudonia
- Species: E. subditella

Binomial name
- Eudonia subditella (Walker, 1866)

Synonyms
- Nephopteryx subditella Walker, 1866

= Eudonia subditella =

Species of moth

Eudonia subditella is a moth in the family Crambidae. It was described by Francis Walker in 1866. This species is endemic to New Zealand.
