= Eudonia orthioplecta =

Scientific classification
- Kingdom: Animalia
- Phylum: Arthropoda
- Class: Insecta
- Order: Lepidoptera
- Family: Crambidae
- Genus: Eudonia
- Species: E. orthioplecta

Binomial name
- Eudonia orthioplecta (Meyrick, 1937)

Synonyms
- Scoparia orthioplecta Meyrick, 1937

Species of moth

Eudonia orthioplecta is a moth of the family Crambidae. It was described by Edward Meyrick in 1937 and is found in Fiji.
