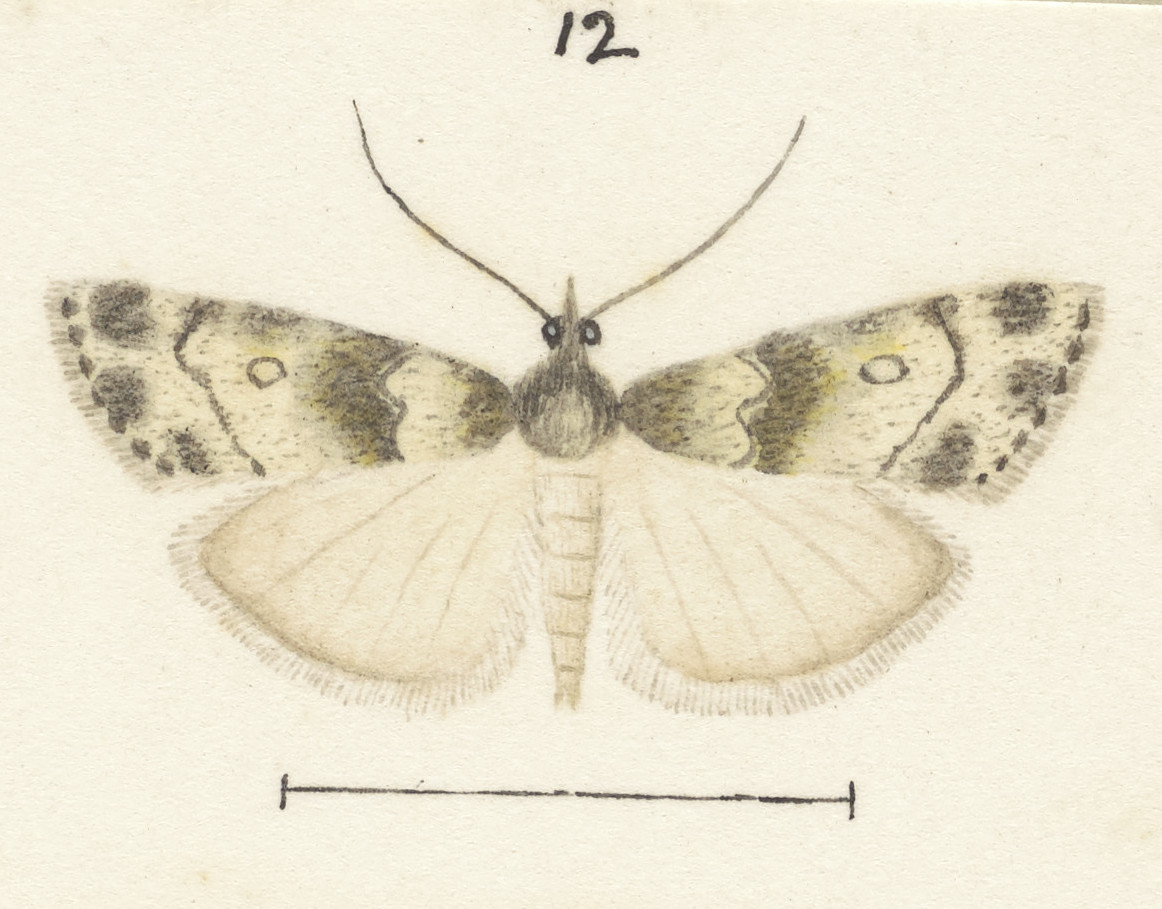

Scientific classification
- Kingdom: Animalia
- Phylum: Arthropoda
- Class: Insecta
- Order: Lepidoptera
- Family: Crambidae
- Genus: Eudonia
- Species: E. meliturga

Binomial name
- Eudonia meliturga (Meyrick, 1905)

Synonyms
- Scoparia meliturga Meyrick, 1905

= Eudonia meliturga =

Species of moth

Eudonia meliturga is a moth in the family Crambidae. It was described by Edward Meyrick in 1905. This species is endemic to New Zealand.

The wingspan is 17–19 mm. The forewings are ochreous-whitish, suffused with pale ochreous-yellowish in the disc and sprinkled with dark fuscous. The first line is ochreous-white, edged posteriorly with dark fuscous suffusion. The second line is ochreous-white, edged anteriorly with dark fuscous. The terminal area is irrorated with dark fuscous and there is an ochreous-whitish subterminal line, as well as an interrupted ochreous-white terminal line. The hindwings are pale whitish-grey, suffused with grey posteriorly. Adults have been recorded on wing in December and January.
