= Eudonia inexoptata =

Scientific classification
- Kingdom: Animalia
- Phylum: Arthropoda
- Class: Insecta
- Order: Lepidoptera
- Family: Crambidae
- Genus: Eudonia
- Species: E. inexoptata

Binomial name
- Eudonia inexoptata (Dyar, 1929)

Synonyms
- Scoparia inexoptata Dyar, 1929

Species of moth

Eudonia inexoptata is a moth in the family Crambidae. It was described by Harrison Gray Dyar Jr. in 1929. It is found in Mexico.

The wingspan is 16–22 mm. The forewings are grey, irrorated (speckled) with black scales. The inner line is pale, followed by a narrow black line. The terminal area is shaded with dark. The hindwings are pale sordid. Adults have been recorded on wing in June.
