= Eudonia threnodes =

Scientific classification
- Kingdom: Animalia
- Phylum: Arthropoda
- Class: Insecta
- Order: Lepidoptera
- Family: Crambidae
- Genus: Eudonia
- Species: E. threnodes

Binomial name
- Eudonia threnodes (Meyrick, 1887)

Synonyms
- Scoparia threnodes Meyrick, 1887

Species of moth

Eudonia threnodes is a moth in the family Crambidae. It was described by Edward Meyrick in 1887. It is found in Australia, where it has been recorded from Western Australia.

The wingspan is 15–17 mm. The forewings are grey, irrorated (sprinkled) with black and with some scattered white scales. The first line is whitish, margined by black posteriorly. The second line is whitish, anteriorly margined by black. The hindwings are pale grey, somewhat darker towards the hindmargin. Adults have been recorded on wing in November.
