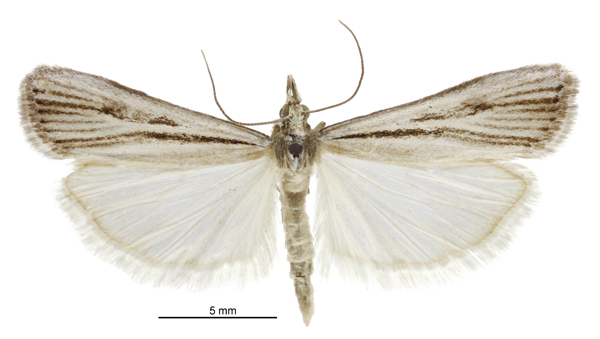
- Male

Scientific classification
- Kingdom: Animalia
- Phylum: Arthropoda
- Class: Insecta
- Order: Lepidoptera
- Family: Crambidae
- Genus: Eudonia
- Species: E. crypsinoa

Binomial name
- Eudonia crypsinoa (Meyrick, 1884)

Synonyms
- Scoparia crypsisoa Meyrick, 1884; Scoparia crypsinoa Meyrick, 1884; Scoparia agana Meyrick, 1912

= Eudonia crypsinoa =

Species of moth

Eudonia crypsinoa is a moth in the family Crambidae. It was named by Edward Meyrick in 1884. It is endemic to New Zealand.

The wingspan is 23–24 mm. The forewings are light ochreous-grey, irrorated with white. The hindwings are grey-whitish. Adults have been recorded on wing in December and January.
