= Eudonia demodes =

Scientific classification
- Kingdom: Animalia
- Phylum: Arthropoda
- Class: Insecta
- Order: Lepidoptera
- Family: Crambidae
- Genus: Eudonia
- Species: E. demodes

Binomial name
- Eudonia demodes (Meyrick, 1888)

Synonyms
- Scoparia demodes (Meyrick, 1888); Xeroscopa demodes Meyrick, 1888

Species of moth

Eudonia dactyliopa is a moth of the family Crambidae. It is endemic to the Hawaiian island of Kauai.
