= Eudonia epicryma =

Scientific classification
- Kingdom: Animalia
- Phylum: Arthropoda
- Class: Insecta
- Order: Lepidoptera
- Family: Crambidae
- Genus: Eudonia
- Species: E. epicryma

Binomial name
- Eudonia epicryma (Meyrick, 1885)

Synonyms
- Scoparia epicryma Meyrick, 1885

Species of moth

Eudonia epicryma is a moth in the family Crambidae. It was described by Edward Meyrick in 1885. It is found in Australia, where it has been recorded from South Australia.

The wingspan is about 15 mm. The forewings are white, sprinkled with blackish. The markings consist of blackish scales, becoming yellowish towards the base. The hindwings are very pale grey, but the hindmargin is darker. There is a faint darker lunule and postmedian line. Adults have been recorded on wing in November.
