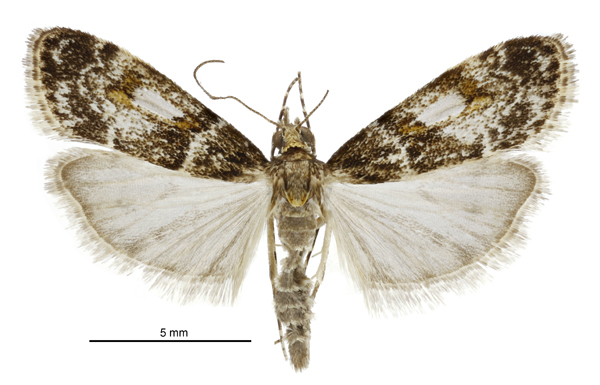
- Male
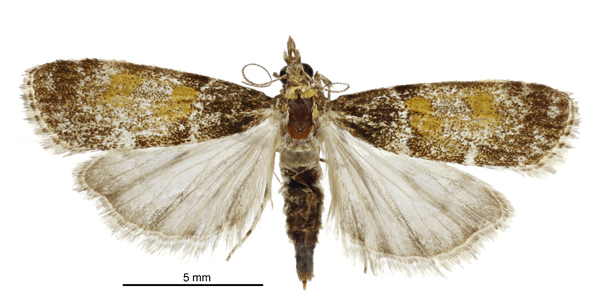
- Female

Scientific classification
- Kingdom: Animalia
- Phylum: Arthropoda
- Class: Insecta
- Order: Lepidoptera
- Family: Crambidae
- Genus: Eudonia
- Species: E. thyridias

Binomial name
- Eudonia thyridias (Meyrick, 1905)

Synonyms
- Scoparia thyridias Meyrick, 1905

= Eudonia thyridias =

Species of moth

Eudonia thyridias is a moth in the family Crambidae. It was described by Edward Meyrick in 1905. It is endemic to New Zealand.

The wingspan is about 18 mm. The forewings are brownish, irrorated with dark fuscous. The first line is white and there is an oblong pellucid patch in the middle of the disc, preceded and followed by blotches of orange suffusion. The second line is white and the subterminal line is whitish. The hindwings are light grey, but darker terminally.
