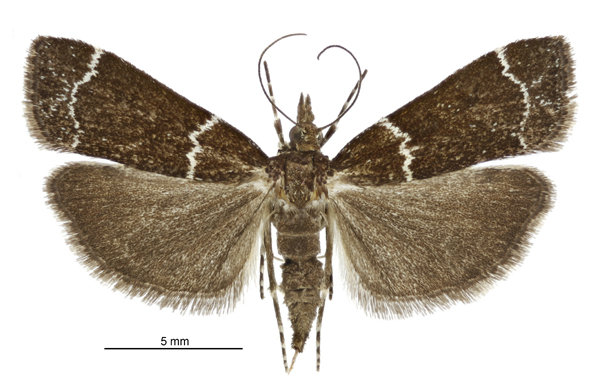
- Female

Scientific classification
- Kingdom: Animalia
- Phylum: Arthropoda
- Class: Insecta
- Order: Lepidoptera
- Family: Crambidae
- Genus: Eudonia
- Species: E. leucogramma

Binomial name
- Eudonia leucogramma (Meyrick, 1884)

Synonyms
- Xeroscopa leucogramma Meyrick, 1884; Scoparia leucogramma (Meyrick, 1884)

= Eudonia leucogramma =

Species of moth

Eudonia leucogramma is a moth in the family Crambidae. This species was first described by Edward Meyrick in 1884. It is endemic to New Zealand.

The wingspan is about 21 mm. The forewings are blackish-fuscous, with some white scales. The first line is white, as is the second line. The hindwings of the males are light grey with a darker hindmargin. Females have dark fuscous-grey hindwings. Adults have been recorded on wing in January.
