= Eudonia nakajimai =

Scientific classification
- Kingdom: Animalia
- Phylum: Arthropoda
- Class: Insecta
- Order: Lepidoptera
- Family: Crambidae
- Genus: Eudonia
- Species: E. nakajimai

Binomial name
- Eudonia nakajimai Sasaki, 2002

Species of moth

Eudonia nakajimai is a moth in the family Crambidae. It was described by Sasaki in 2002. It is found in Japan.
