= Eudonia liebmanni =

Scientific classification
- Kingdom: Animalia
- Phylum: Arthropoda
- Class: Insecta
- Order: Lepidoptera
- Family: Crambidae
- Genus: Eudonia
- Species: E. liebmanni

Binomial name
- Eudonia liebmanni (Petry, 1904)

Synonyms
- Scoparia liebmanni Petry, 1904

Species of moth

Eudonia liebmanni is a species of moth in the family Crambidae. It is found on Corsica.

The wingspan is 16-18.5 mm.
