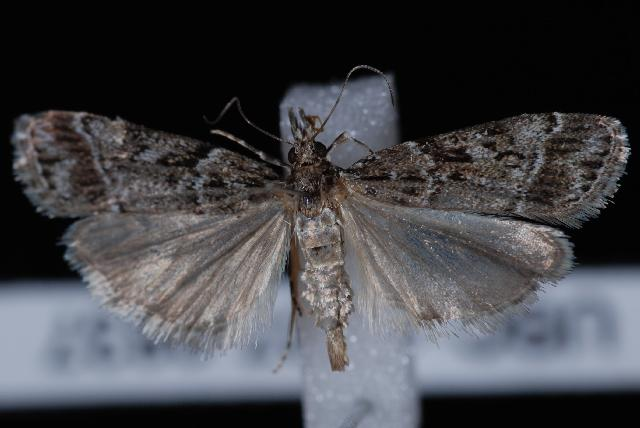

Scientific classification
- Kingdom: Animalia
- Phylum: Arthropoda
- Clade: Pancrustacea
- Class: Insecta
- Order: Lepidoptera
- Family: Crambidae
- Genus: Eudonia
- Species: E. rectilinea

Binomial name
- Eudonia rectilinea (Zeller, 1874)

Synonyms
- Scoparia rectilinea Zeller, 1874; Scoparia nominatalis Hulst, 1886; Scoparia refugalis Hulst, 1886

= Eudonia rectilinea =

Species of moth

Eudonia rectilinea is a moth in the family Crambidae. It was described by Zeller in 1874. It is found in North America, where it has been recorded from British Columbia, California, Montana, Nevada, Oregon and Washington.

The length of the forewings is 8–10 mm. Adults have been recorded on wing from April to September.
