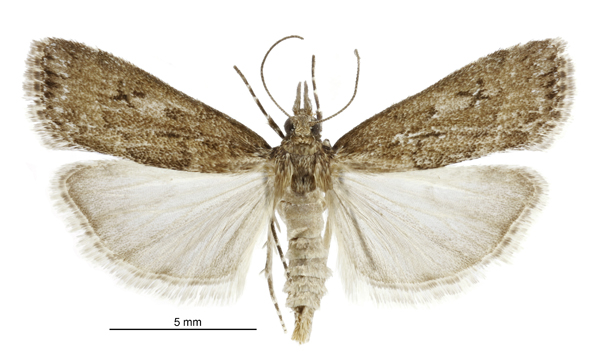
- Female
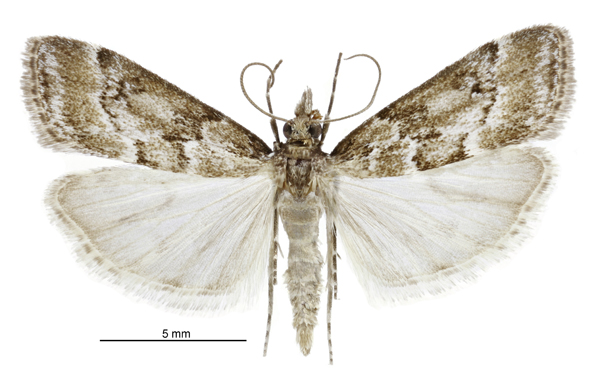
- Male

Scientific classification
- Kingdom: Animalia
- Phylum: Arthropoda
- Class: Insecta
- Order: Lepidoptera
- Family: Crambidae
- Genus: Eudonia
- Species: E. dochmia

Binomial name
- Eudonia dochmia (Meyrick, 1905)

Synonyms
- Scoparia dochmia Meyrick, 1905

= Eudonia dochmia =

Species of moth

Eudonia dochmia is a moth in the family Crambidae. It was described by Edward Meyrick in 1905. It is endemic to New Zealand.

The wingspan is about 20 mm. The forewings are light brownish, irrorated with darker. The veins and margins are irrorated with blackish and the median area with white. The hindwings are pale whitish-fuscous, with a slight brassy tinge. There is a grey discal spot and a grey postmedian line. The termen is suffused with grey.
