= Eudonia crataea =

Scientific classification
- Kingdom: Animalia
- Phylum: Arthropoda
- Class: Insecta
- Order: Lepidoptera
- Family: Crambidae
- Genus: Eudonia
- Species: E. crataea

Binomial name
- Eudonia crataea (Meyrick, 1899)

Synonyms
- Scoparia crataea Meyrick, 1899; Scoparia ombrodes perkinsi Zimmerman, 1958

Species of moth

Eudonia crataea is a moth of the family Crambidae. It is endemic to the island of Hawaii.
