= Eudonia luteusalis =

Scientific classification
- Kingdom: Animalia
- Phylum: Arthropoda
- Class: Insecta
- Order: Lepidoptera
- Family: Crambidae
- Genus: Eudonia
- Species: E. luteusalis

Binomial name
- Eudonia luteusalis (Hampson, 1907)

Synonyms
- Scoparia luteusalis Hampson, 1907; Bradyrrhoa versicolorella Rebel, 1940

Species of moth

Eudonia luteusalis is a species of moth in the family Crambidae. It is found on the Azores.
