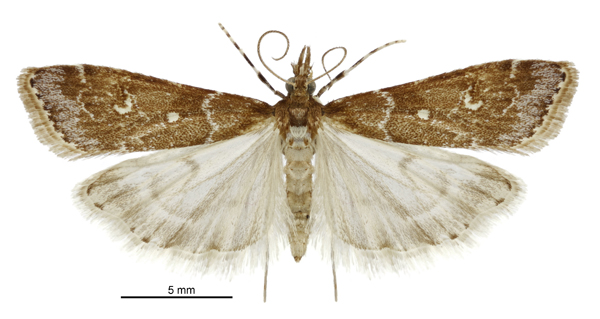
- Male

Scientific classification
- Kingdom: Animalia
- Phylum: Arthropoda
- Clade: Pancrustacea
- Class: Insecta
- Order: Lepidoptera
- Family: Crambidae
- Genus: Eudonia
- Species: E. quaestoria

Binomial name
- Eudonia quaestoria (Meyrick, 1929)

Synonyms
- Scoparia quaestoria Meyrick, 1929

= Eudonia quaestoria =

Species of moth

Eudonia quaestoria is a moth in the family Crambidae. It was described by Edward Meyrick in 1929. This species is endemic to New Zealand.

The wingspan is 22–25 mm. The forewings are brown, with a slight ferruginous tinge. The first and second lines are whitish. The hindwings are whitish-grey, but greyer posteriorly. Adults have been recorded on wing in November.
