= Eudonia erebochalca =

Scientific classification
- Kingdom: Animalia
- Phylum: Arthropoda
- Class: Insecta
- Order: Lepidoptera
- Family: Crambidae
- Genus: Eudonia
- Species: E. erebochalca

Binomial name
- Eudonia erebochalca (Meyrick, 1899)

Synonyms
- Scoparia erebochalca Meyrick, 1899

Species of moth

Eudonia erebochalca is a moth of the family Crambidae. It is endemic to the islands of Hawaii and Molokai.
