= Eudonia australialis =

Scientific classification
- Kingdom: Animalia
- Phylum: Arthropoda
- Class: Insecta
- Order: Lepidoptera
- Family: Crambidae
- Genus: Eudonia
- Species: E. australialis

Binomial name
- Eudonia australialis (Guenée, 1854)

Synonyms
- Scoparia australialis Guenée, 1854

Species of moth

Eudonia australialis is a moth in the family Crambidae. It was described by Achille Guenée in 1854. It is found in Australia.
