= Eudonia siderina =

Scientific classification
- Kingdom: Animalia
- Phylum: Arthropoda
- Class: Insecta
- Order: Lepidoptera
- Family: Crambidae
- Genus: Eudonia
- Species: E. siderina

Binomial name
- Eudonia siderina (Meyrick, 1899)

Synonyms
- Scoparia siderina Meyrick, 1899

Species of moth

Eudonia siderina is a moth of the family Crambidae. It is native to the Hawaiian islands of Kauai and Maui.

The larvae feed on moss.
