= Eudonia ianthes =

Scientific classification
- Kingdom: Animalia
- Phylum: Arthropoda
- Class: Insecta
- Order: Lepidoptera
- Family: Crambidae
- Genus: Eudonia
- Species: E. ianthes

Binomial name
- Eudonia ianthes (Meyrick, 1899)

Synonyms
- Scoparia ianthes Meyrick, 1899; Scoparia nectarias Meyrick, 1899; Eudonia nectarias

Species of moth

Eudonia ianthes is a moth of the family Crambidae. It is endemic to the Hawaiian islands of Kauai, Oahu, Lanai and Hawaii.
