= Eudonia paraequalis =

Scientific classification
- Kingdom: Animalia
- Phylum: Arthropoda
- Class: Insecta
- Order: Lepidoptera
- Family: Crambidae
- Genus: Eudonia
- Species: E. paraequalis

Binomial name
- Eudonia paraequalis Nel, 2012

Species of moth

Eudonia paraequalis is a moth in the family Crambidae. It was described by Jacques Nel in 2012. It is found in France.
