= Eudonia notozeucta =

Scientific classification
- Kingdom: Animalia
- Phylum: Arthropoda
- Class: Insecta
- Order: Lepidoptera
- Family: Crambidae
- Genus: Eudonia
- Species: E. notozeucta

Binomial name
- Eudonia notozeucta (Meyrick, 1938)

Synonyms
- Scoparia notozeucta Meyrick, 1938

Species of moth

Eudonia notozeucta is a moth in the family Crambidae. It was described by Edward Meyrick in 1938. It is found on Java in Indonesia.
