= Eudonia pygmina =

Scientific classification
- Kingdom: Animalia
- Phylum: Arthropoda
- Class: Insecta
- Order: Lepidoptera
- Family: Crambidae
- Genus: Eudonia
- Species: E. pygmina

Binomial name
- Eudonia pygmina Leraut, 1988

Species of moth

Eudonia pygmina is a moth in the family Crambidae. It was described by Patrice J.A. Leraut in 1988. It is found in French Guiana.
