= Eudonia malgassicella =

Scientific classification
- Kingdom: Animalia
- Phylum: Arthropoda
- Clade: Pancrustacea
- Class: Insecta
- Order: Lepidoptera
- Family: Crambidae
- Genus: Eudonia
- Species: E. malgassicella

Binomial name
- Eudonia malgassicella (Marion, 1956)

Synonyms
- Witlesia malgassicella Marion, 1956

Species of moth

Eudonia malgassicella is a moth in the family Crambidae. It was described by Hubert Marion in 1956. It is found on Madagascar.
