= Eudonia montana =

Scientific classification
- Kingdom: Animalia
- Phylum: Arthropoda
- Class: Insecta
- Order: Lepidoptera
- Family: Crambidae
- Genus: Eudonia
- Species: E. montana

Binomial name
- Eudonia montana (Butler, 1882)

Synonyms
- Scoparia coarctata var. montana Butler, 1882; Xeroscopa melanopis Meyrick, 1888; Scoparia melanopis

Species of moth

Eudonia montana is a moth of the family Crambidae. It is endemic to the Hawaiian island of Oahu.
