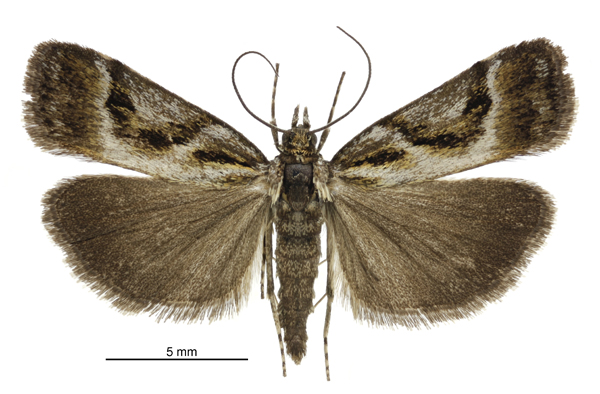
- Male

Scientific classification
- Kingdom: Animalia
- Phylum: Arthropoda
- Class: Insecta
- Order: Lepidoptera
- Family: Crambidae
- Genus: Eudonia
- Species: E. hemicycla

Binomial name
- Eudonia hemicycla (Meyrick, 1884)

Synonyms
- Scoparia hemicycla Meyrick, 1884

= Eudonia hemicycla =

Species of moth

Eudonia hemicycla is a moth in the family Crambidae. It was described by Edward Meyrick in 1884. This species is endemic to New Zealand.

The wingspan is about 17 mm. The forewings are fuscous, with scattered pale ochreous-yellowish scales. There is a cloudy blackish spot on the inner margin near the base. Above this is a line of whitish scales. The hindwings are fuscous-grey, becoming dark fuscous towards the hindmargin. Adults have been recorded on wing in January.
