= Eudonia peronetis =

Scientific classification
- Kingdom: Animalia
- Phylum: Arthropoda
- Class: Insecta
- Order: Lepidoptera
- Family: Crambidae
- Genus: Eudonia
- Species: E. peronetis

Binomial name
- Eudonia peronetis (Meyrick, 1899)

Synonyms
- Scoparia peronetis Meyrick, 1899

Species of moth

Eudonia peronetis is a moth of the family Crambidae. It is endemic to the island of Hawaii.
