= Eudonia gonodecta =

Scientific classification
- Kingdom: Animalia
- Phylum: Arthropoda
- Class: Insecta
- Order: Lepidoptera
- Family: Crambidae
- Genus: Eudonia
- Species: E. gonodecta

Binomial name
- Eudonia gonodecta (Meyrick, 1904)

Synonyms
- Scoparia gonodecta Meyrick, 1904

Species of moth

Eudonia gonodecta is a moth of the family Crambidae. It is endemic to the Hawaiian island of Kauai.
