= Eudonia amphicypella =

Scientific classification
- Kingdom: Animalia
- Phylum: Arthropoda
- Clade: Pancrustacea
- Class: Insecta
- Order: Lepidoptera
- Family: Crambidae
- Genus: Eudonia
- Species: E. amphicypella

Binomial name
- Eudonia amphicypella (Meyrick, 1899)

Synonyms
- Scoparia amphicypella Meyrick, 1899

Species of moth

Eudonia amphicypella is a moth of the family Crambidae. It is endemic to the Hawaiian island of Kauai.
