= Eudonia idiogama =

Scientific classification
- Kingdom: Animalia
- Phylum: Arthropoda
- Class: Insecta
- Order: Lepidoptera
- Family: Crambidae
- Genus: Eudonia
- Species: E. idiogama

Binomial name
- Eudonia idiogama (Meyrick, 1935)

Synonyms
- Scoparia idiogama Meyrick, 1935

Species of moth

Eudonia idiogama is a moth in the family Crambidae. It was described by Edward Meyrick in 1935. It is found in the Democratic Republic of the Congo (Orientale Province) and Uganda.
