= Eudonia medinella =

Scientific classification
- Kingdom: Animalia
- Phylum: Arthropoda
- Class: Insecta
- Order: Lepidoptera
- Family: Crambidae
- Genus: Eudonia
- Species: E. medinella

Binomial name
- Eudonia medinella (Snellen, 1890)

Synonyms
- Scoparia medinella Snellen, 1890

Species of moth

Eudonia medinella is a moth in the family Crambidae. It was described by Pieter Cornelius Tobias Snellen in 1890. It is found in Sikkim, India.

The wingspan is 15.5–16.5 mm. The basal fourth of the forewings is black with bluish-grey scales. The ground colour of the remainder of the forewings is bluish white. The first line is bluish white. The second line is narrowly edged with black towards the base. The hindwings are shining pale grey.
