= Eudonia achlya =

Scientific classification
- Kingdom: Animalia
- Phylum: Arthropoda
- Class: Insecta
- Order: Lepidoptera
- Family: Crambidae
- Genus: Eudonia
- Species: E. achlya

Binomial name
- Eudonia achlya J. F. G. Clarke, 1986

Species of moth

Eudonia achlya is a moth in the family Crambidae. It was described by John Frederick Gates Clarke in 1986. It is found on the Marquesas Archipelago in French Polynesia.
