= Eudonia cleodoralis =

Scientific classification
- Kingdom: Animalia
- Phylum: Arthropoda
- Class: Insecta
- Order: Lepidoptera
- Family: Crambidae
- Genus: Eudonia
- Species: E. cleodoralis

Binomial name
- Eudonia cleodoralis (Walker, 1859)

Synonyms
- Scoparia cleodoralis Walker, 1859

Species of moth

Eudonia cleodoralis is a moth in the family Crambidae. It was described by Francis Walker in 1859. It is found in Australia, where it has been recorded from New South Wales, Victoria and Tasmania.

Adults have been recorded on wing from November to February.
