= Eudonia speideli =

Scientific classification
- Kingdom: Animalia
- Phylum: Arthropoda
- Class: Insecta
- Order: Lepidoptera
- Family: Crambidae
- Genus: Eudonia
- Species: E. speideli

Binomial name
- Eudonia speideli Leraut, 1982

Species of moth

Eudonia speideli is a species of moth in the family Crambidae. It is found on Crete and in Turkey.
