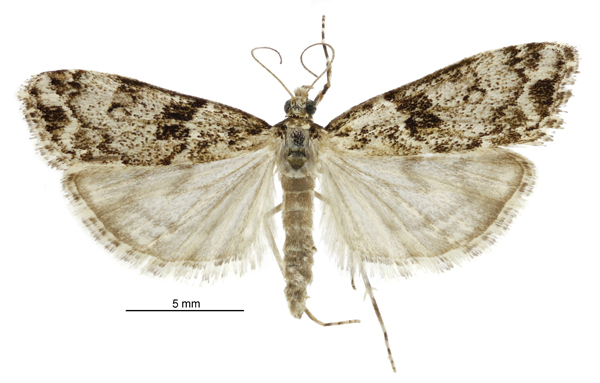
- Male

Scientific classification
- Kingdom: Animalia
- Phylum: Arthropoda
- Class: Insecta
- Order: Lepidoptera
- Family: Crambidae
- Genus: Eudonia
- Species: E. locularis

Binomial name
- Eudonia locularis (Meyrick, 1912)

Synonyms
- Scoparia locularis Meyrick, 1912

= Eudonia locularis =

Species of moth

Eudonia locularis is a moth in the family Crambidae. It was described by Edward Meyrick in 1912. This species is endemic to New Zealand.

The wingspan is about 21 mm. The forewings are light grey, mixed with white and with some scattered black scales. There is a streak of black suffusion from the base of the costa. The first line is white, edged with black suffusion posteriorly. The second line is white, edged with black anteriorly. The hindwings are pale grey, becoming darker posteriorly. The discal mark and postmedian line are darker. Adults have been recorded on wing in January and February.
