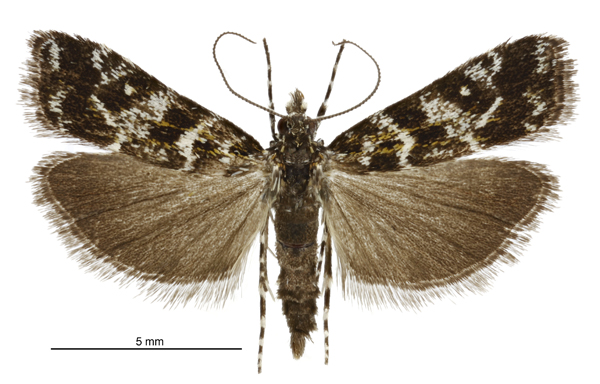
- Male

Scientific classification
- Kingdom: Animalia
- Phylum: Arthropoda
- Class: Insecta
- Order: Lepidoptera
- Family: Crambidae
- Genus: Eudonia
- Species: E. critica

Binomial name
- Eudonia critica (Meyrick, 1884)

Synonyms
- Scoparia critica Meyrick, 1884

= Eudonia critica =

Species of moth

Eudonia critica is a moth in the family Crambidae. It was named by Edward Meyrick in 1884. It is endemic to New Zealand.

The wingspan is 13–15.5 mm. The forewings are fuscous-grey, mixed with blackish. The median space is irrorated with white. The hindwings are dark fuscous-grey, becoming darker posteriorly. Adults have been recorded on wing in January.
