= Eudonia clavula =

Scientific classification
- Kingdom: Animalia
- Phylum: Arthropoda
- Clade: Pancrustacea
- Class: Insecta
- Order: Lepidoptera
- Family: Crambidae
- Genus: Eudonia
- Species: E. clavula

Binomial name
- Eudonia clavula J. F. G. Clarke, 1986

Species of moth

Eudonia clavula is a moth in the family Crambidae, subfamily Scopariinae. It was described by John Frederick Gates Clarke in 1986. It has a wingspan of 16-18mm of a buff color, with some spots. It is found on the Marquesas Archipelago in French Polynesia. Its conservation status is unknown; it is not listed in the IUCN redlist.
