= Eudonia interlinealis =

Scientific classification
- Kingdom: Animalia
- Phylum: Arthropoda
- Clade: Pancrustacea
- Class: Insecta
- Order: Lepidoptera
- Family: Crambidae
- Genus: Eudonia
- Species: E. interlinealis

Binomial name
- Eudonia interlinealis (Warren, 1905)

Synonyms
- Scoparia interlinealis Warren, 1905; Scoparia interlinealis ab. pallidimarginalis Warren, 1905

Species of moth

Eudonia interlinealis is a species of moth in the family Crambidae. It is found on the Azores.

The wingspan is about 16 mm. The forewings are ochreous-grey with darker grey markings. The hindwings are shining whitish grey and darker along the margin.
