= Eudonia rotundalis =

Scientific classification
- Kingdom: Animalia
- Phylum: Arthropoda
- Class: Insecta
- Order: Lepidoptera
- Family: Crambidae
- Genus: Eudonia
- Species: E. rotundalis

Binomial name
- Eudonia rotundalis Munroe, 1972

Species of moth

Eudonia rotundalis is a moth in the family Crambidae. It was described by Eugene G. Munroe in 1972. It is found in North America, where it has been recorded from Arizona, Colorado and New Mexico.
