= Eudonia marioni =

Scientific classification
- Kingdom: Animalia
- Phylum: Arthropoda
- Class: Insecta
- Order: Lepidoptera
- Family: Crambidae
- Genus: Eudonia
- Species: E. marioni

Binomial name
- Eudonia marioni (Leraut, 1989)

Synonyms
- Witlesia marioni Leraut, 1989

Species of moth

Eudonia marioni is a moth in the family Crambidae. It was described by Patrice J.A. Leraut in 1989. It is found in Madagascar.
