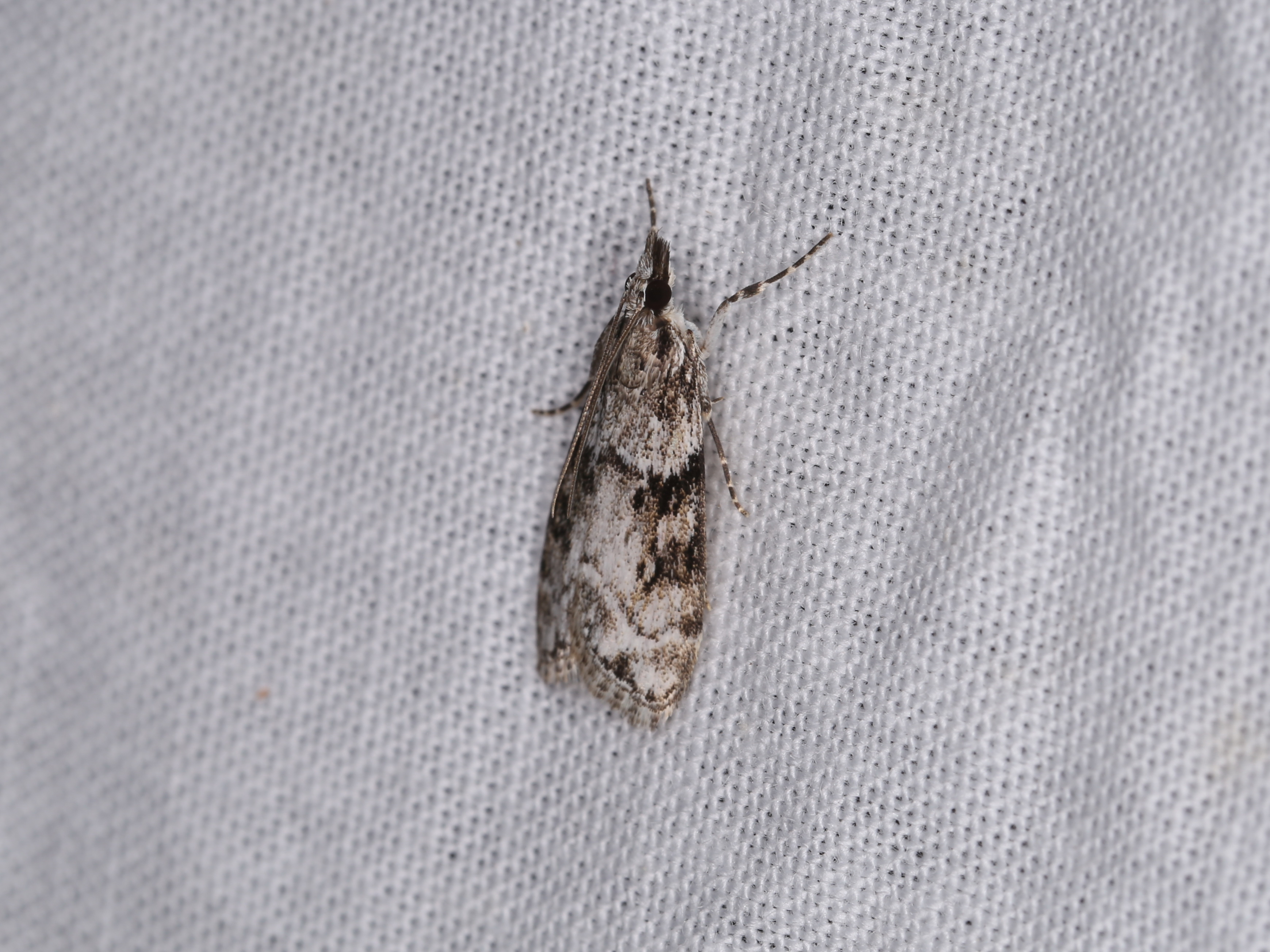

Scientific classification
- Kingdom: Animalia
- Phylum: Arthropoda
- Class: Insecta
- Order: Lepidoptera
- Family: Crambidae
- Genus: Eudonia
- Species: E. spaldingalis

Binomial name
- Eudonia spaldingalis (Barnes & McDunnough, 1912)

Synonyms
- Scoparia spaldingalis Barnes & McDunnough, 1912

= Eudonia spaldingalis =

Species of moth

Eudonia spaldingalis is a moth in the family Crambidae. It was described by William Barnes and James Halliday McDunnough in 1912. It is found in North America, where it has been recorded from Alberta, Arizona, British Columbia, California, Colorado, Montana, Nevada, New Mexico, Utah and Wyoming.

The wingspan is 17–19 mm. The forewings are pale gray, suffused with blackish. The basal third is pale with a short black basal dash. The antemedial line is black and the subterminal line is pale. The hindwings are pale, but somewhat smoky on the outer margin. Adults have been recorded on wing from June to August.
