= Eudonia gracilineata =

Scientific classification
- Kingdom: Animalia
- Phylum: Arthropoda
- Clade: Pancrustacea
- Class: Insecta
- Order: Lepidoptera
- Family: Crambidae
- Genus: Eudonia
- Species: E. gracilineata

Binomial name
- Eudonia gracilineata Nuss, 2000

Species of moth

Eudonia gracilineata is a moth in the family Crambidae. It was described by Nuss in 2000. It is found in Lesotho.
