= Eudonia bidentata =

Scientific classification
- Kingdom: Animalia
- Phylum: Arthropoda
- Class: Insecta
- Order: Lepidoptera
- Family: Crambidae
- Genus: Eudonia
- Species: E. bidentata

Binomial name
- Eudonia bidentata Maes, 2004

Species of moth

Eudonia bidentata is a moth in the family Crambidae. It was described by Koen V. N. Maes in 2004. It is found in Kenya, South Africa and Zimbabwe.
