= Eudonia probolaea =

Scientific classification
- Kingdom: Animalia
- Phylum: Arthropoda
- Class: Insecta
- Order: Lepidoptera
- Family: Crambidae
- Genus: Eudonia
- Species: E. probolaea

Binomial name
- Eudonia probolaea (Meyrick, 1899)

Synonyms
- Scoparia probolaea Meyrick, 1899; Scoparia omichlopis Meyrick, 1899

Species of moth

Eudonia probolaea is a moth of the family Crambidae. It is endemic to the Hawaiian islands of Kauai and Hawaii. Eudonia omichlopis is considered a valid species by some authors, while others include it within E. probolaea.
