= Eudonia tivira =

Scientific classification
- Kingdom: Animalia
- Phylum: Arthropoda
- Class: Insecta
- Order: Lepidoptera
- Family: Crambidae
- Genus: Eudonia
- Species: E. tivira

Binomial name
- Eudonia tivira (J. F. G. Clarke, 1971)

Synonyms
- Scoparia tivira J. F. G. Clarke, 1971

Species of moth

Eudonia tivira is a moth in the family Crambidae. It was described by John Frederick Gates Clarke in 1971. It is found in French Polynesia, where it has been recorded from Rapa Iti.
