= Eudonia perinetensis =

Scientific classification
- Kingdom: Animalia
- Phylum: Arthropoda
- Class: Insecta
- Order: Lepidoptera
- Family: Crambidae
- Genus: Eudonia
- Species: E. perinetensis

Binomial name
- Eudonia perinetensis (Leraut, 1989)

Synonyms
- Malageudonia perinetensis Leraut, 1989

Species of moth

Eudonia perinetensis is a species of moth in the family Crambidae.

It is primarily located in Madagascar.

It was described by Patrice J.A. Leraut in 1989.
