= Eudonia entabeniensis =

Scientific classification
- Kingdom: Animalia
- Phylum: Arthropoda
- Class: Insecta
- Order: Lepidoptera
- Family: Crambidae
- Genus: Eudonia
- Species: E. entabeniensis

Binomial name
- Eudonia entabeniensis Maes, 2004

Species of moth

Eudonia entabeniensis is a moth in the family Crambidae. It was described by Koen V. N. Maes in 2004. It is found in South Africa.
