= Eudonia hawaiiensis =

Scientific classification
- Kingdom: Animalia
- Phylum: Arthropoda
- Class: Insecta
- Order: Lepidoptera
- Family: Crambidae
- Genus: Eudonia
- Species: E. hawaiiensis

Binomial name
- Eudonia hawaiiensis (Butler, 1881)

Synonyms
- Scoparia hawaiiensis Butler, 1881; Xeroscopa hawaiiensis; Scoparia hawaiensis Klima, 1937

Species of moth

Eudonia hawaiiensis is a moth of the family Crambidae. It is endemic to the Hawaiian islands of Oahu, Molokai, Maui and Hawaii.
