= Eudonia tyrophanta =

Scientific classification
- Kingdom: Animalia
- Phylum: Arthropoda
- Class: Insecta
- Order: Lepidoptera
- Family: Crambidae
- Genus: Eudonia
- Species: E. tyrophanta

Binomial name
- Eudonia tyrophanta (Meyrick, 1932)

Synonyms
- Scoparia tyrophanta Meyrick, 1932

Species of moth

Eudonia tyrophanta is a moth belonging to the family Crambidae. It was described by Edward Meyrick in 1932. It is found in Uganda.
