= Eudonia meristis =

Scientific classification
- Kingdom: Animalia
- Phylum: Arthropoda
- Class: Insecta
- Order: Lepidoptera
- Family: Crambidae
- Genus: Eudonia
- Species: E. meristis

Binomial name
- Eudonia meristis (Meyrick, 1899)

Synonyms
- Scoparia meristis Meyrick, 1899; Scoparia halmaea Meyrick, 1899

Species of moth

Eudonia meristis is a moth of the family Crambidae. It is endemic to the Hawaiian islands of Oahu, Molokai, Kauai and Hawaii. The larvae feed on moss.

== Subspecies ==
- Eudonia meristis meristis (Oahu, Molokai, Hawaii)
- Eudonia meristis halmaea Meyrick, 1899 (Kauai)
