= Eudonia protorthra =

Scientific classification
- Kingdom: Animalia
- Phylum: Arthropoda
- Class: Insecta
- Order: Lepidoptera
- Family: Crambidae
- Genus: Eudonia
- Species: E. protorthra

Binomial name
- Eudonia protorthra (Meyrick, 1885)

Synonyms
- Scoparia protorthra Meyrick, 1885

Species of moth

Eudonia protorthra is a moth in the family Crambidae. It was described by Edward Meyrick in 1885. It is found in Australia, where it has been recorded from New South Wales, Queensland and Victoria.
