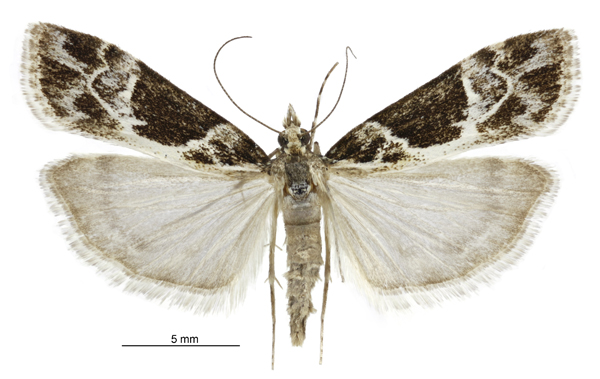
- Female
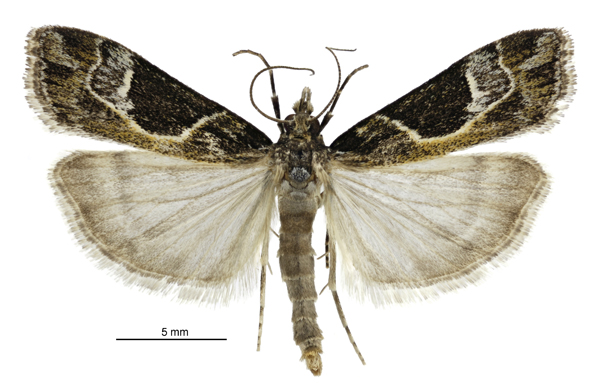
- Male

Scientific classification
- Kingdom: Animalia
- Phylum: Arthropoda
- Class: Insecta
- Order: Lepidoptera
- Family: Crambidae
- Genus: Eudonia
- Species: E. melanaegis

Binomial name
- Eudonia melanaegis (Meyrick, 1884)

Synonyms
- Scoparia melanaegis Meyrick, 1885

= Eudonia melanaegis =

Species of moth

Eudonia melanaegis is a moth in the family Crambidae. It was named by Edward Meyrick in 1884. This species is endemic to New Zealand.

Adults have been recorded on the wing in December and January.
