= Eudonia excursalis =

Scientific classification
- Kingdom: Animalia
- Phylum: Arthropoda
- Class: Insecta
- Order: Lepidoptera
- Family: Crambidae
- Genus: Eudonia
- Species: E. excursalis

Binomial name
- Eudonia excursalis (Dyar, 1929)

Synonyms
- Scoparia excursalis Dyar, 1929

Species of moth

Eudonia excursalis is a moth in the family Crambidae. It was described by Harrison Gray Dyar Jr. in 1929. It is found in Costa Rica.

The wingspan is about 11 mm. The forewings are light grey with a violaceous tint and some black shading at the base. The inner line is pale and indistinct, but indicated by black outer shading. The reniform spot is dark, diffused and stained with reddish centrally. Adults have been recorded on wing in February.
