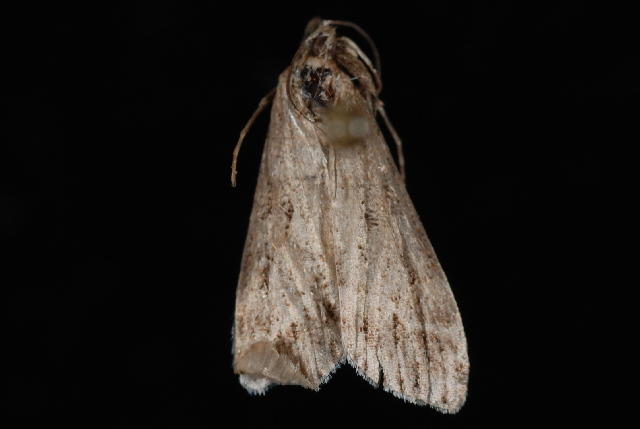

Scientific classification
- Kingdom: Animalia
- Phylum: Arthropoda
- Class: Insecta
- Order: Lepidoptera
- Family: Crambidae
- Genus: Eudonia
- Species: E. commortalis

Binomial name
- Eudonia commortalis (Dyar, 1921)

Synonyms
- Scoparia commortalis Dyar, 1921

= Eudonia commortalis =

Species of moth

Eudonia commortalis is a moth in the family Crambidae. It was described by Harrison Gray Dyar Jr. in 1921. It is found in North America, where it has been recorded from Alaska to British Columbia, Washington and California.

Adults have been recorded on wing from April to September.
