= Eudonia singulannulata =

Scientific classification
- Kingdom: Animalia
- Phylum: Arthropoda
- Clade: Pancrustacea
- Class: Insecta
- Order: Lepidoptera
- Family: Crambidae
- Genus: Eudonia
- Species: E. singulannulata

Binomial name
- Eudonia singulannulata W.-C. Li, H.-H. Li & Nuss, 2012

Species of moth

Eudonia singulannulata is a moth in the family Crambidae. It was described by Wei-Chun Li, Hou-Hun Li and Matthias Nuss in 2012. It is found in China (Henan, Ningxia, Shaanxi, Sichuan, Xinjiang).

The length of the forewings is 8–10 mm.
