= Eudonia crassiuscula =

Scientific classification
- Kingdom: Animalia
- Phylum: Arthropoda
- Class: Insecta
- Order: Lepidoptera
- Family: Crambidae
- Genus: Eudonia
- Species: E. crassiuscula

Binomial name
- Eudonia crassiuscula (Dyar, 1929)

Synonyms
- Scoparia crassiuscula Dyar, 1929

Species of moth

Eudonia crassiuscula is a moth in the family Crambidae. It was described by Harrison Gray Dyar Jr. in 1929. It is found in Brazil (Paraná) and French Guiana.

The wingspan is about 13 mm.
