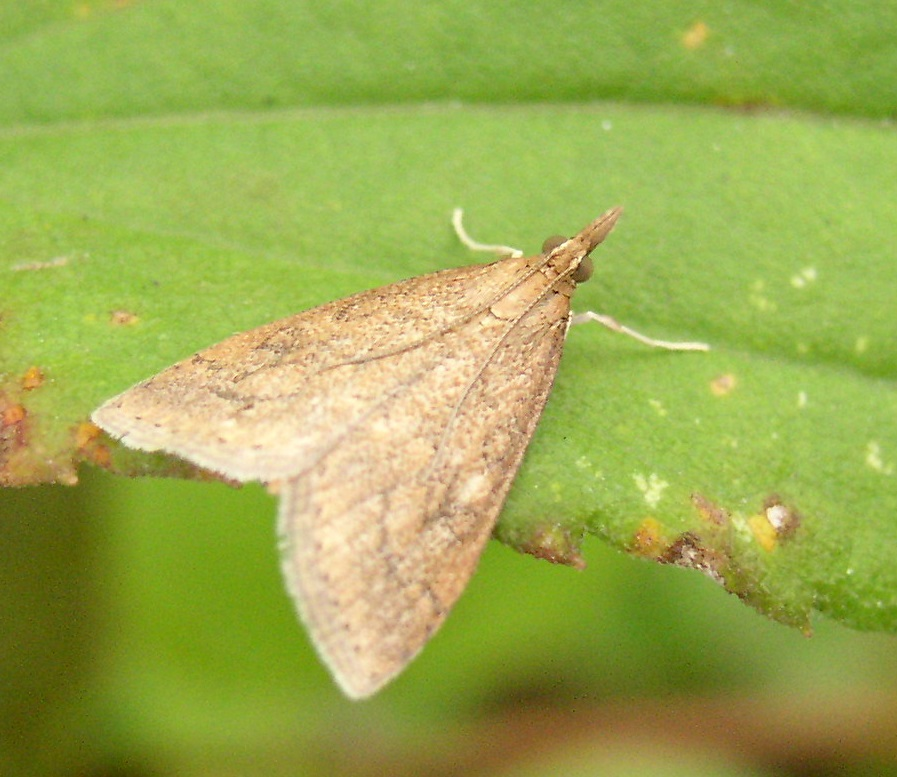
- Udea rubigalis

Scientific classification
- Kingdom: Animalia
- Phylum: Arthropoda
- Clade: Pancrustacea
- Class: Insecta
- Order: Lepidoptera
- Family: Crambidae
- Subfamily: Spilomelinae
- Tribe: Udeini
- Genus: Udea; Guenée in Duponchel, 1845

Synonyms
- Melanomecyna Butler, 1883; Notophytis Meyrick, 1932; Protaulacistis Meyrick, 1899; Protocolletis Meyrick, 1888; Stantira Walker, 1863

= Udea =

Genus of moths

Udea is a genus of snout moths in the subfamily Spilomelinae of the family Crambidae. The genus was erected by Achille Guenée in 1845. The currently known 216 species are present on all continents except Antarctica. About 41 species are native to Hawaii.

== Systematics ==
The genus is placed in the tribe Udeini, where it is closest related to the genera Mnesictena, Deana and Udeoides. In the past, Mnesictena was included in Udea, but it is currently considered a separate genus comprising seven species.

The North American, European and African Udea species have been treated in several studies, and a number of species groups has been proposed (see below).

== Species ==
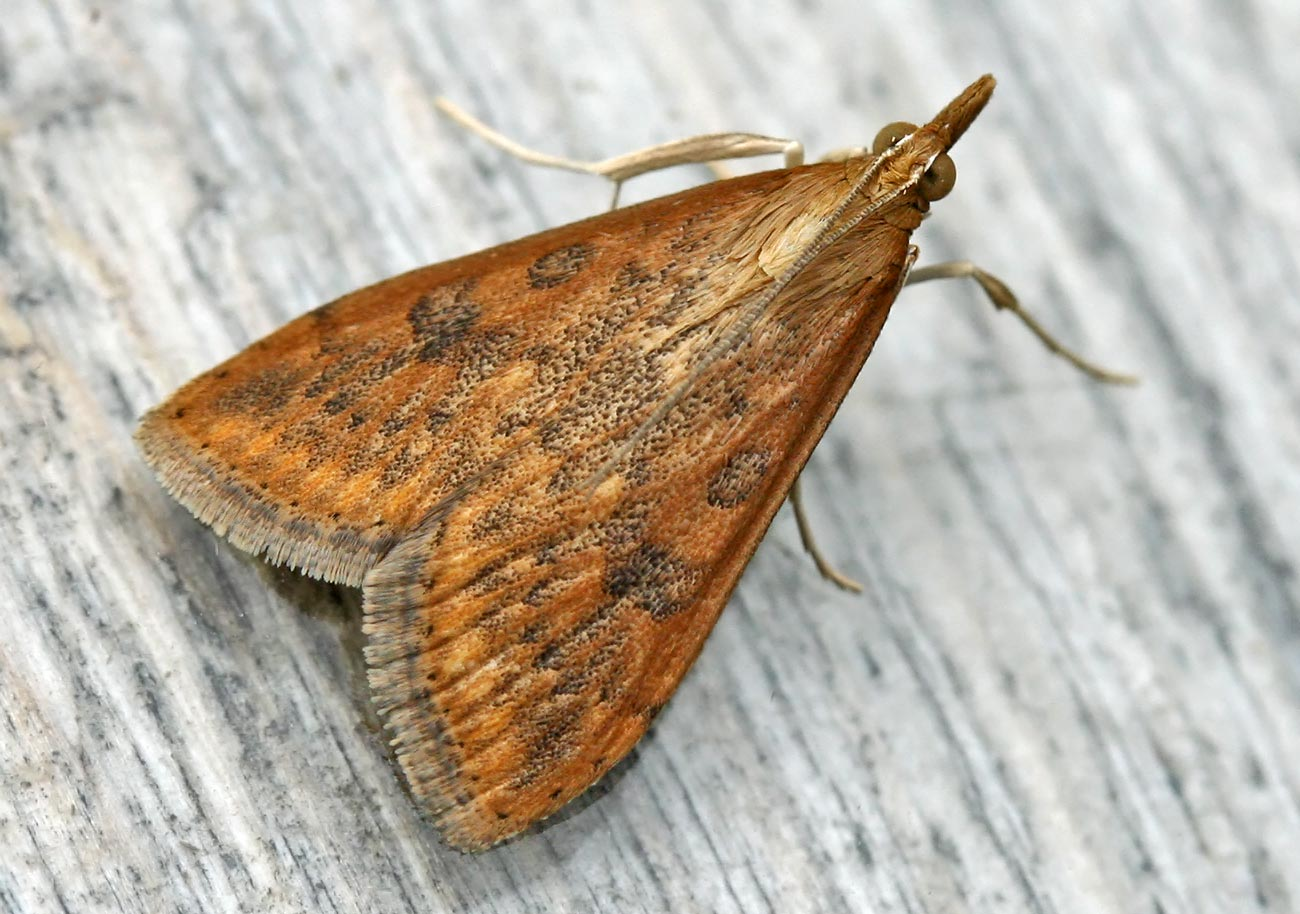
Udea ferrugalis, adult

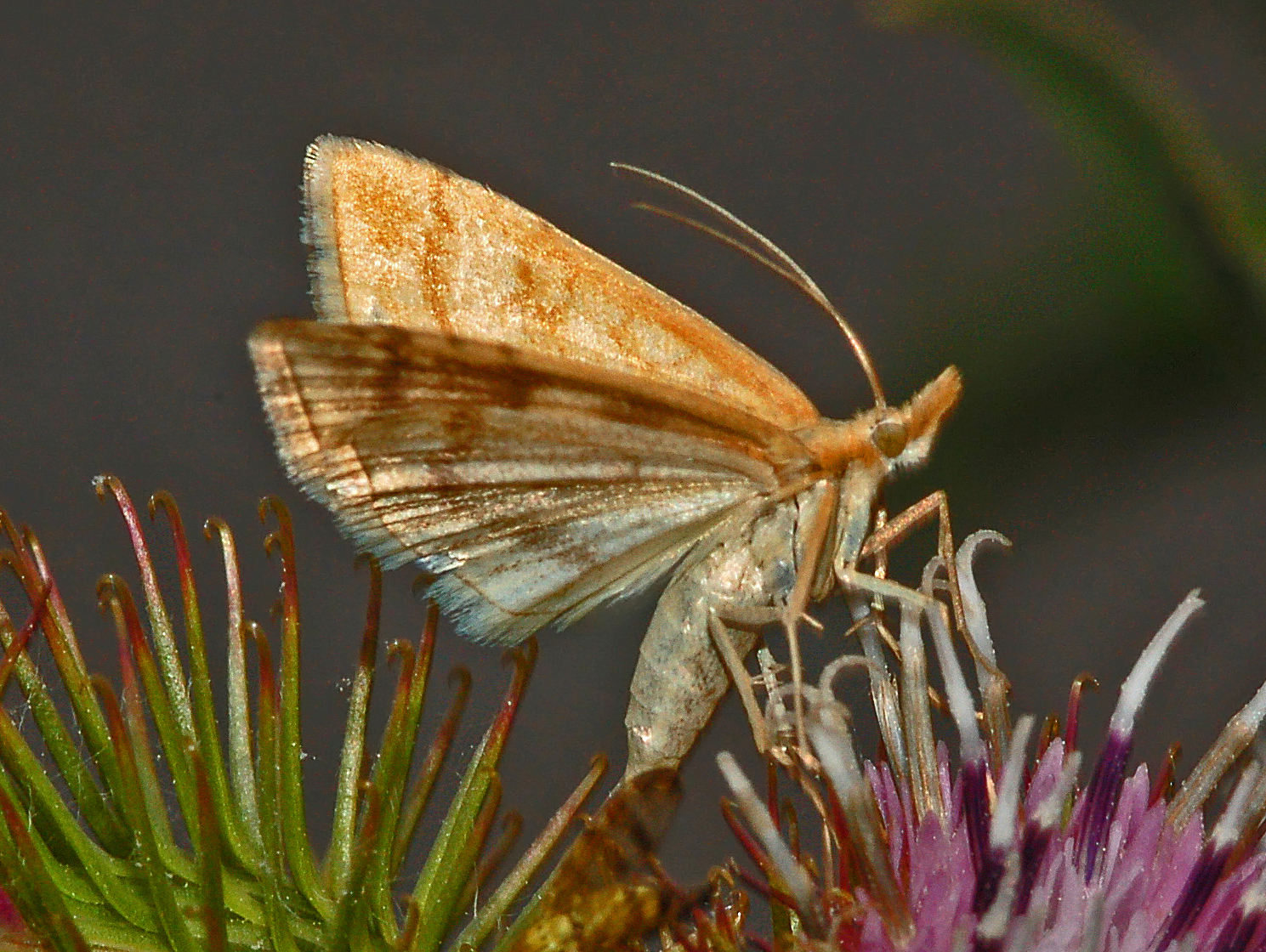
Udea lutealis, adult

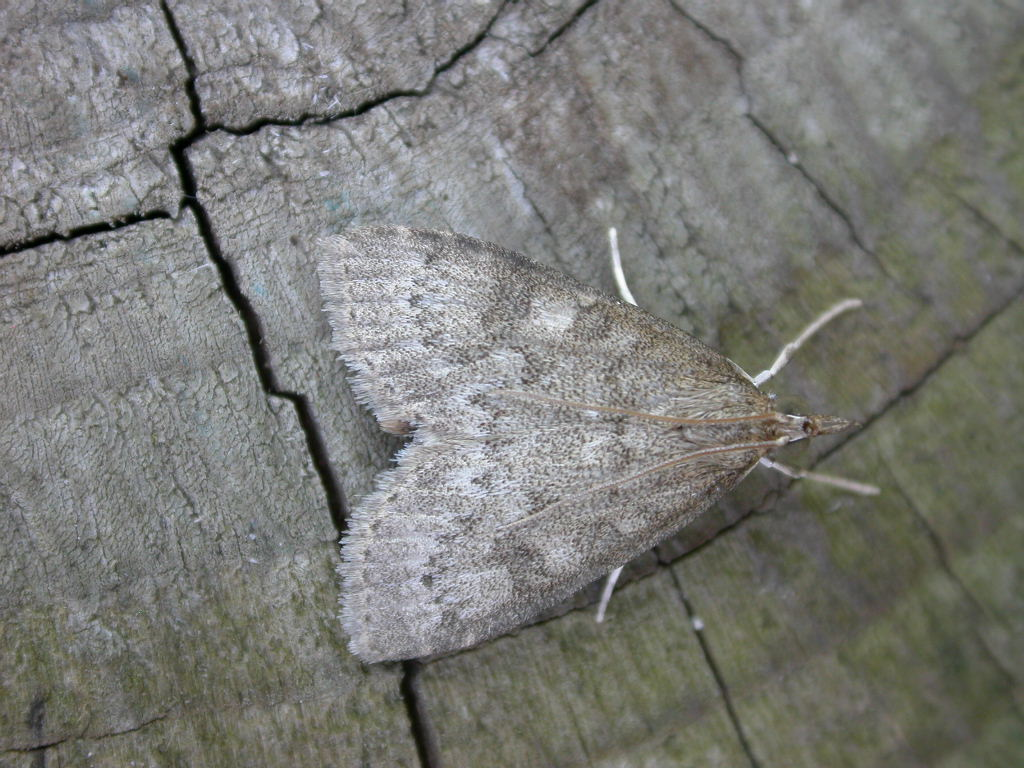
Udea prunalis, adult

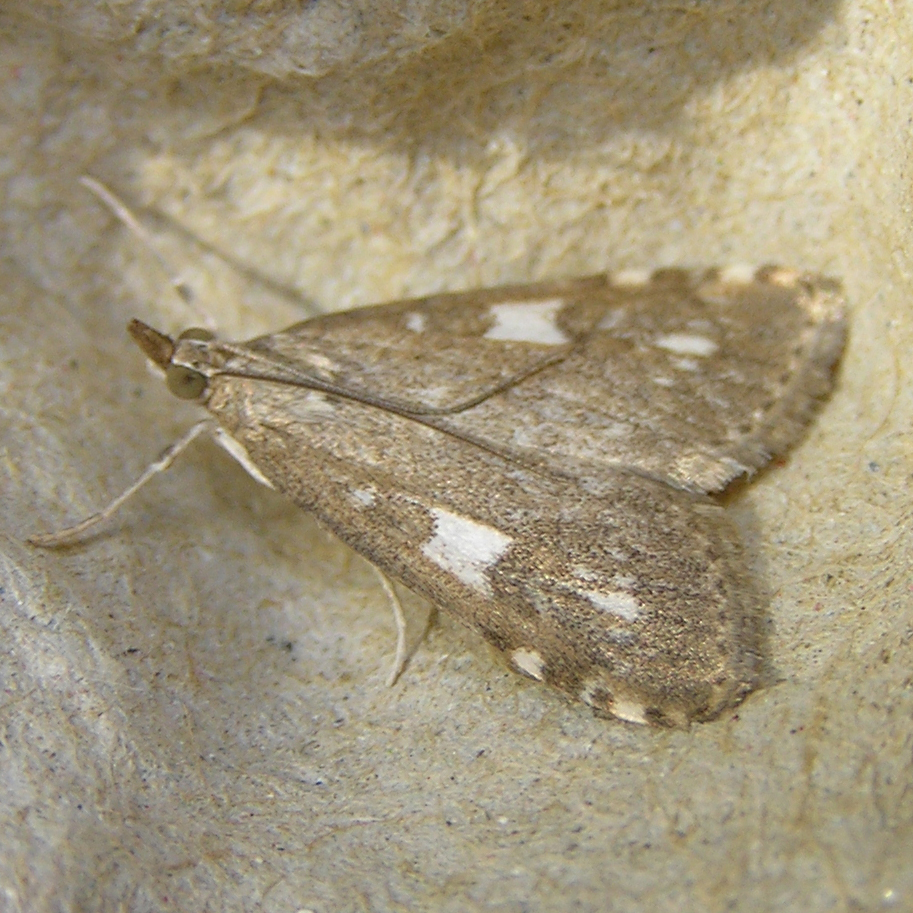
Udea olivalis, adult

Udea ferrugalis species group:

- Udea accolalis (Zeller, 1867)
- Udea azorensis Meyer, Nuss & Speidel, 1997
- Udea delineatalis (Walker in Melliss, 1875)
- Udea exigualis (Wileman, 1911)
- Udea ferrugalis (Hübner, 1796)
- Udea heterodoxa (Meyrick, 1899)
- Udea kirinyaga Mally in Mally et al., 2022
- Udea liopis (Meyrick, 1899)
- Udea lugubralis (Leech, 1889)
- Udea maderensis (Bethune-Baker, 1894)
- Udea meruensis Mally in Mally et al., 2022
- Udea momella Mally in Mally et al., 2022
- Udea montensis Mutuura, 1954
- Udea namaquana Karisch & Mally in Mally et al., 2022
- Udea nicholsae Mally in Mally et al., 2022
- Udea nordmani (Rebel, 1935)
- Udea profundalis (Packard, 1873)
- Udea pyranthes (Meyrick, 1899)
- Udea rubigalis (Guenée, 1854)
- Udea rusticalis (Barnes & McDunnough, 1914)
- Udea stationalis Yamanaka, 1988
- Udea swezeyi (Zimmerman, 1951)

Udea itysalis species group:

- Udea abstrusa Munroe, 1966
- Udea beringialis Munroe, 1966
- Udea brevipalpis Munroe, 1966
- Udea cacuminicola Munroe, 1966)
- Udea costalis (Eversmann, 1852)
- Udea derasa Munroe, 1966
- Udea itysalis (Walker, 1859)
- Udea livida Munroe, 1966
- Udea radiosalis (Möschler, 1883)
- Udea tachdirtalis (Zerny, 1935)
- Udea turmalis (Grote, 1881)

Udea numeralis species group:

- Udea ardekanalis Amsel, 1961
- Udea bipunctalis (Herrich-Schäffer, 1848)
- Udea confinalis (Lederer, 1858)
- Udea cyanalis (La Harpe, 1855)
- Udea exalbalis (Caradja, 1916)
- Udea fimbriatralis (Duponchel, 1833)
- Udea fulvalis (Hübner, 1809)
- Udea hageni Viette, 1952
- Udea institalis (Hübner, 1819)
- Udea languidalis (Eversmann, 1842)
- Udea lutealis (Hübner, 1809)
- Udea numeralis (Hübner, 1796)
- Udea olivalis (Denis & Schiffermüller, 1775)
- Udea praepetalis (Lederer, 1869)
- Udea ruckdescheli Mally, Segerer & Nuss, 2016
- Udea tritalis (Christoph, 1881)
- Udea zernyi (Klima in Zerny, 1940)

Udea alpinalis species group:

- Udea alpinalis (Denis & Schiffermüller, 1775)
- Udea altaica (Zerny, 1914)
- Udea austriacalis (Herrich-Schäffer, 1851)
- Udea bourgognealis Leraut, 1996
- Udea carniolica Huemer & Tarmann, 1989
- Udea cretacea (Filipjev, 1925)
- Udea donzelalis (Guenée, 1854)
- Udea juldusalis (Zerny, 1914)
- Udea murinalis (Fischer von Röslerstamm, 1842)
- Udea nebulalis (Hübner, 1796)
- Udea plumbalis (Zerny, 1914)
- Udea rhododendronalis (Duponchel, 1834)
- Udea uliginosalis (Stephens, 1834)

Udea decrepitalis species group:

- Udea decrepitalis (Herrich-Schäffer, 1848)
- Udea hamalis (Thunberg, 1792)
- Udea inquinatalis (Lienig & Zeller, 1846)
- Udea prunalis (Denis & Schiffermüller, 1775)

Species unplaced in any species group:

- Udea absolutalis (Dyar, 1913)
- Udea aenigmatica (Heinrich, 1931)
- Udea affinialis (Zerny, 1914)
- Udea afghanalis (Amsel, 1970)
- Udea aksualis (Caradja, 1928)
- Udea alaskalis (Gibson, 1920)
- Udea albipunctalis Dognin, 1905
- Udea albostriata Zhang & Li, 2016
- Udea amitina (Butler, 1883)
- Udea angustalis (Dognin, 1905)
- Udea annectans Munroe, 1974
- Udea argoscelis (Meyrick, 1888)
- Udea asychanalis (Druce, 1899)
- Udea auratalis (Warren, 1895)
- Udea aurora (Butler, 1881)
- Udea autoclesalis (Walker, 1859)
- Udea berberalis (Barnes & McDunnough, 1918)
- Udea binoculalis (Hampson, 1904)
- Udea brontias (Meyrick, 1899)
- Udea bryochloris (Meyrick, 1899)
- Udea caliginosalis (Ragonot, 1894)
- Udea calliastra (Meyrick, 1899)
- Udea caminopis (Meyrick, 1899)
- Udea capsifera (Meyrick, 1933)
- Udea cataphaea (Meyrick, 1899)
- Udea chalcophanes (Meyrick, 1899)
- Udea chloropis (Meyrick, 1899)
- Udea chytropa (Meyrick, 1899)
- Udea cinerea (Butler, 1883)
- Udea conisalias (Meyrick, 1899)
- Udea constricta (Butler, 1882)
- Udea conubialis Yamanaka, 1972
- Udea coranialis Munroe, 1967
- Udea costiplaga (Dognin, 1913)
- Udea crambialis (Druce, 1899)
- Udea curvata Zhang & Li, 2016
- Udea decoripennis Munroe, 1967
- Udea defectalis (Sauber, 1899)
- Udea despecta (Butler, 1877)
- Udea detersalis (Walker, 1866)
- Udea diopsalis (Hampson, 1913)
- Udea dracontias (Meyrick, 1899)
- Udea dryadopa (Meyrick, 1899)
- Udea elutalis (Denis & Schiffermüller, 1775)
- Udea endopyra (Meyrick, 1899)
- Udea endotrichialis (Hampson, 1918)
- Udea ennychioides (Butler, 1881)
- Udea ephippias (Meyrick, 1899)
- Udea eucrena (Meyrick, 1888)
- Udea ferrealis (Hampson, 1900)
- Udea flavofimbriata (Moore, 1888)
- Udea fulcrialis (Sauber, 1899)
- Udea fumipennis (Warren, 1892)
- Udea fusculalis (Hampson, 1899)
- Udea gigantalis Dognin, 1912
- Udea grisealis Inoue, Yamanaka & Sasaki, 2008
- Udea helioxantha (Meyrick, 1899)
- Udea helviusalis (Walker, 1859)
- Udea hyalistis (Lower, 1902)
- Udea ialis (Walker, 1859)
- Udea ichinosawana (Matsumura, 1925)
- Udea illineatalis (Dognin, 1904)
- Udea incertalis (Caradja in Caradja & Meyrick, 1937)
- Udea indistincta (Butler, 1883)
- Udea indistinctalis Warren, 1892
- Udea inferioralis (Walker, 1866)
- Udea inhospitalis Warren, 1892
- Udea intermedia Inoue, Yamanaka & Sasaki, 2008
- Udea karagaialis (Caradja, 1916)
- Udea khorassanalis (Amsel, 1950)
- Udea kusnezovi Sinev, 2008
- Udea lagunalis (Schaus, 1913)
- Udea lampadias (Meyrick, 1904)
- Udea latipennalis (Caradja, 1928)
- Udea lenta (Meyrick, 1936)
- Udea lerautalis Tautel, 2014
- Udea litorea (Butler, 1883)
- Udea mandronalis (Walker, 1859)
- Udea mechedalis (Amsel, 1950)
- Udea melanephra (Hampson, 1913)
- Udea melanopis (Meyrick, 1899)
- Udea melanosticta (Butler, 1883)
- Udea metasema (Meyrick, 1899)
- Udea micacea (Butler, 1881)
- Udea minnehaha (Pryer, 1877)
- Udea montanalis (Schaus, 1912)
- Udea monticolens (Butler, 1882)
- Udea nea (Strand, 1918)
- Udea nebulatalis Inoue, Yamanaka & Sasaki, 2008
- Udea nigrescens (Butler, 1881)
- Udea nigripunctata Warren, 1892
- Udea nigrostigmalis Warren, 1896
- Udea nomophilodes (Hampson, 1913)
- Udea nordeggensis (McDunnough, 1929)
- Udea ochreocapitalis (Ragonot, 1894)
- Udea ochropera (Hampson, 1913)
- Udea octosignalis (Hulst, 1886)
- Udea ommatias (Meyrick, 1899)
- Udea orbicentralis (Christoph, 1881)
- Udea pachygramma (Meyrick, 1899)
- Udea paghmanalis (Amsel, 1970)
- Udea phaealis (Hampson, 1899)
- Udea phaethontia (Meyrick, 1899)
- Udea phyllostegia (Swezey, 1946)
- Udea planalis (South in Leech & South, 1901)
- Udea platyleuca (Meyrick, 1899)
- Udea poasalis (Schaus, 1912)
- Udea poliostolalis (Hampson, 1918)
- Udea praefulvalis (Amsel, 1970)
- Udea proximalis Inoue, Yamanaka & Sasaki, 2008
- Udea pseudocrocealis (South in Leech & South, 1901)
- Udea psychropa (Meyrick, 1899)
- Udea punctiferalis (South in Leech & South, 1901)
- Udea punoalis Munroe, 1967
- Udea pyraustiformis (Toll, 1948)
- Udea ragonotii (Butler, 1883)
- Udea renalis Moore, 1888
- Udea russispersalis (Zerny, 1914)
- Udea sabulosalis Warren, 1892
- Udea saxifragae (McDunnough, 1935)
- Udea schaeferi (Caradja in Caradja & Meyrick, 1937)
- Udea scoparialis (Hampson, 1899)
- Udea scorialis (Zeller, 1847)
- Udea secernalis (Möschler, 1890)
- Udea secticostalis (Hampson, 1913)
- Udea sheppardi (McDunnough, 1929)
- Udea simplicella (La Harpe, 1861)
- Udea sobrinalis (Guenée, 1854)
- Udea soratalis Munroe, 1967
- Udea stellata (Butler, 1883)
- Udea stigmatalis (Wileman, 1911)
- Udea subplanalis (Caradja in Caradja & Meyrick, 1937)
- Udea suisharyonensis (Strand, 1918)
- Udea suralis (Schaus, 1933)
- Udea tenoalis Munroe, 1974
- Udea testacea (Butler, 1879)
- Udea tetragramma (J. F. G. Clarke, 1965)
- Udea thermantis (Meyrick, 1899)
- Udea thermantoidis (Swezey, 1913)
- Udea thoonalis (Walker, 1859)
- Udea thyalis (Walker, 1859)
- Udea torvalis (Möschler, 1864)
- Udea umbriferalis (Hampson, 1918)
- Udea uralica Slamka, 2013
- Udea vacunalis (Grote, 1881)
- Udea vastalis (Christoph in Romanoff, 1887)
- Udea violae (Swezey, 1933)
- Udea viridalis (Dognin, 1904)
- Udea washingtonalis (Grote, 1882)

== Former species ==
- Udea catilualis (Hampson, 1900), synonymized with Udea numeralis
- Udea conquisitalis (Guenee, 1849), transferred to the Glaphyriinae genus Evergestis
- Udea epicoena (Meyrick, 1937), a synonym of Udea ferrugalis
- Udea illutalis (Guenée, 1854), a synonym of Udea numeralis
- Udea infuscalis Zeller, 1852, transferred to the Pyraustinae genus Lirabotys
- Udea melanostictalis (Hampson in Poulton, 1916), transferred to the Pyraustinae genus Achyra
- Udea pauperalis (Staudinger, 1879), transferred to the Pyraustinae genus Pyrausta
- Udea perfervidalis (Hampson, 1900), transferred to the Spilomelinae genus Metasia
- Udea sviridovi Bolshakov, 2002, synonymized with Udea exalbalis
