= Udea nordeggensis =

Scientific classification
- Domain: Eukaryota
- Kingdom: Animalia
- Phylum: Arthropoda
- Class: Insecta
- Order: Lepidoptera
- Family: Crambidae
- Genus: Udea
- Species: U. nordeggensis

Binomial name
- Udea nordeggensis (McDunnough, 1929)

Synonyms
- Phlyctaenia nordeggensis McDunnough, 1929

Species of moth

Udea nordeggensis is a moth in the family Crambidae. It was described by James Halliday McDunnough in 1929. It is found in North America, where it has been recorded from Alberta.
