= Udea suisharyonensis =

Scientific classification
- Domain: Eukaryota
- Kingdom: Animalia
- Phylum: Arthropoda
- Class: Insecta
- Order: Lepidoptera
- Family: Crambidae
- Genus: Udea
- Species: U. suisharyonensis

Binomial name
- Udea suisharyonensis (Strand, 1918)

Synonyms
- Pionea suisharyonensis Strand, 1918; Pionea lolotialis Caradja, 1927; Udea lototialis Hua, 2005

Species of moth

Udea suisharyonensis is a moth in the family Crambidae. It was described by Strand in 1918. It is found in China and Taiwan.
