= Udea alaskalis =

Scientific classification
- Kingdom: Animalia
- Phylum: Arthropoda
- Class: Insecta
- Order: Lepidoptera
- Family: Crambidae
- Genus: Udea
- Species: U. alaskalis

Binomial name
- Udea alaskalis (Gibson, 1920)

Synonyms
- Diasemia alaskalis Gibson, 1920

Species of moth

Udea alaskalis is a moth in the family Crambidae. It was described by Arthur Gibson in 1920. It is a high Arctic species found in North America, where it has been recorded from Alaska. It is also found in Greenland and northern European Russia.

The wingspan is about 22 mm. The forewings are pale brownish with whitish scales along the costa from the base to the reniform and with a whitish area from a line to the outer margin. The veins are more or less marked with brown and the costal margin is yellowish brown. The orbicular is oval, defined by brown and filled with yellowish brown. The reniform is rather large and elongate quadrate. It is slightly constricted centrally and filled with yellowish brown. The hindwings are whitish, thinly spotted with brown scales. The discal spot is brown and an inner second brown spot is present midway between the discal spot and the costal margin.
