= Udea stellata =

Scientific classification
- Domain: Eukaryota
- Kingdom: Animalia
- Phylum: Arthropoda
- Class: Insecta
- Order: Lepidoptera
- Family: Crambidae
- Genus: Udea
- Species: U. stellata

Binomial name
- Udea stellata (Butler, 1883)

Synonyms
- Melanomecyna stellata Butler, 1883; Oeobia stellata; Scopula stellata; Pionea stellata; Phlyctaenia stellata

Species of moth

Udea stellata is a moth of the family Crambidae. It is endemic to the Hawaiian islands of Kauai, Oahu, Molokai and Hawaii.

The larvae feed on Neraudia melastomaefolia and Pipturus albidus.
