= Udea ardekanalis =

Scientific classification
- Domain: Eukaryota
- Kingdom: Animalia
- Phylum: Arthropoda
- Class: Insecta
- Order: Lepidoptera
- Family: Crambidae
- Genus: Udea
- Species: U. ardekanalis

Binomial name
- Udea ardekanalis Amsel, 1961

Species of moth

Udea ardekanalis is a moth in the family Crambidae. It was described by Hans Georg Amsel in 1961 and is found in Iran.
