= Udea inferioralis =

Scientific classification
- Kingdom: Animalia
- Phylum: Arthropoda
- Class: Insecta
- Order: Lepidoptera
- Family: Crambidae
- Genus: Udea
- Species: U. inferioralis

Binomial name
- Udea inferioralis (Walker, 1866)

Synonyms
- Botys inferioralis Walker, 1866

Species of moth

Udea inferioralis is a moth in the family Crambidae. It was described by Francis Walker in 1866. It is found in Seram, Indonesia.

Adults are pale ochreous, the wings two brownish denticulated lines. The forewings two brownish ringlets in the disc between the first and second line.
