= Udea psychropa =

Scientific classification
- Kingdom: Animalia
- Phylum: Arthropoda
- Class: Insecta
- Order: Lepidoptera
- Family: Crambidae
- Genus: Udea
- Species: U. psychropa

Binomial name
- Udea psychropa (Meyrick, 1899)

Synonyms
- Pyrausta psychropa Meyrick, 1899; Oeobia psychropa

Species of moth

Udea psychropa is a moth of the family Crambidae. It is endemic to the Hawaiian island of Kauai.
