= Udea costiplaga =

Scientific classification
- Domain: Eukaryota
- Kingdom: Animalia
- Phylum: Arthropoda
- Class: Insecta
- Order: Lepidoptera
- Family: Crambidae
- Genus: Udea
- Species: U. costiplaga

Binomial name
- Udea costiplaga (Dognin, 1913)

Synonyms
- Pionea costiplaga Dognin, 1913

Species of moth

Udea costiplaga is a moth in the family Crambidae. It was described by Paul Dognin in 1913. It is found in Colombia.
