= Udea orbicentralis =

Scientific classification
- Kingdom: Animalia
- Phylum: Arthropoda
- Class: Insecta
- Order: Lepidoptera
- Family: Crambidae
- Genus: Udea
- Species: U. orbicentralis

Binomial name
- Udea orbicentralis (Christoph, 1881)

Synonyms
- Botys orbicentralis Christoph, 1881; Pionea orbicentralis; Udea arbicentralis Hua, 2005

Species of moth

Udea orbicentralis is a moth in the family Crambidae. It was described by Hugo Theodor Christoph in 1881. It is found in the Russian Far East (Primorsky Krai, Amur), Korea, western China and Japan.

The wingspan is 19–25 mm.
