= Udea russispersalis =

Scientific classification
- Domain: Eukaryota
- Kingdom: Animalia
- Phylum: Arthropoda
- Class: Insecta
- Order: Lepidoptera
- Family: Crambidae
- Genus: Udea
- Species: U. russispersalis

Binomial name
- Udea russispersalis (Zerny, 1914)

Synonyms
- Pionea russispersalis Zerny, 1914

Species of moth

Udea russispersalis is a moth in the family Crambidae. It was described by Zerny in 1914. It is found in China (Xinjiang).
