= Udea micacea =

Scientific classification
- Domain: Eukaryota
- Kingdom: Animalia
- Phylum: Arthropoda
- Class: Insecta
- Order: Lepidoptera
- Family: Crambidae
- Genus: Udea
- Species: U. micacea

Binomial name
- Udea micacea (Butler, 1881)

Synonyms
- Aporodes micacea Butler, 1881; Oeobia micacea; Scoparia micacea; Phlyctaenia micacea; Phlyctaenia iocrossa Meyrick, 1899

Species of moth

Udea micacea is a moth of the family Crambidae. It is endemic to the Hawaiian islands of Kauai, Oahu, Molokai and Maui.

The larvae feed on Cyrtandra species, including Cyrtandra cordifolia.
