= Udea capsifera =

Scientific classification
- Kingdom: Animalia
- Phylum: Arthropoda
- Class: Insecta
- Order: Lepidoptera
- Family: Crambidae
- Genus: Udea
- Species: U. capsifera

Binomial name
- Udea capsifera (Meyrick, 1933)

Synonyms
- Phlyctaenia capsifera Meyrick, 1933

Species of moth

Udea capsifera is a moth in the family Crambidae. It was described by Edward Meyrick in 1933. It is found in Argentina.
