= Udea helviusalis =

Scientific classification
- Kingdom: Animalia
- Phylum: Arthropoda
- Class: Insecta
- Order: Lepidoptera
- Family: Crambidae
- Genus: Udea
- Species: U. helviusalis

Binomial name
- Udea helviusalis (Walker, 1859)

Synonyms
- Scopula helviusalis Walker, 1859; Crambus bogotanellus Walker, 1866; Pionea fuscipalpalis Walker, 1866; Scopula bogotalis Walker, 1866; Scopula fuscipalpalis Walker, 1859; Scopula itylusalis Walker, 1859

Species of moth

Udea helviusalis is a moth in the family Crambidae. It was described by Francis Walker in 1859. It is found in Colombia.
