= Udea indistinctalis =

Scientific classification
- Domain: Eukaryota
- Kingdom: Animalia
- Phylum: Arthropoda
- Class: Insecta
- Order: Lepidoptera
- Family: Crambidae
- Genus: Udea
- Species: U. indistinctalis

Binomial name
- Udea indistinctalis Warren, 1892

Species of moth

Udea indistinctalis is a moth in the family Crambidae. It was described by William Warren in 1892. It is found in North America, where it has been recorded from Alberta, Saskatchewan, Washington and California.

The wingspan of Udea indistinctalis is approximately 26 mm. The forewings are pale grey, tinged with fawn, and sparsely dusted with blackish dots. The lines and stigmata are slightly darker, edged with black dots, while the exterior line is thick and bluntly denticulate (tooth like). The central area of the forewing is slightly paler than the rest. A row of small dark dots appears before the base of the fringes, which feature a darker medial line. The hindwings are dark ochreous, dusted with grey and marked by an indistinct dark discal spot and a submarginal line. Beyond this line, the outer portion of the wing is darker. Adults have been recorded on the wing from June to July and again from September to October.

== Subspecies ==
- Udea indistinctalis indistinctalis
- Udea indistinctalis johnstoni Munroe, 1966 (Washington)
