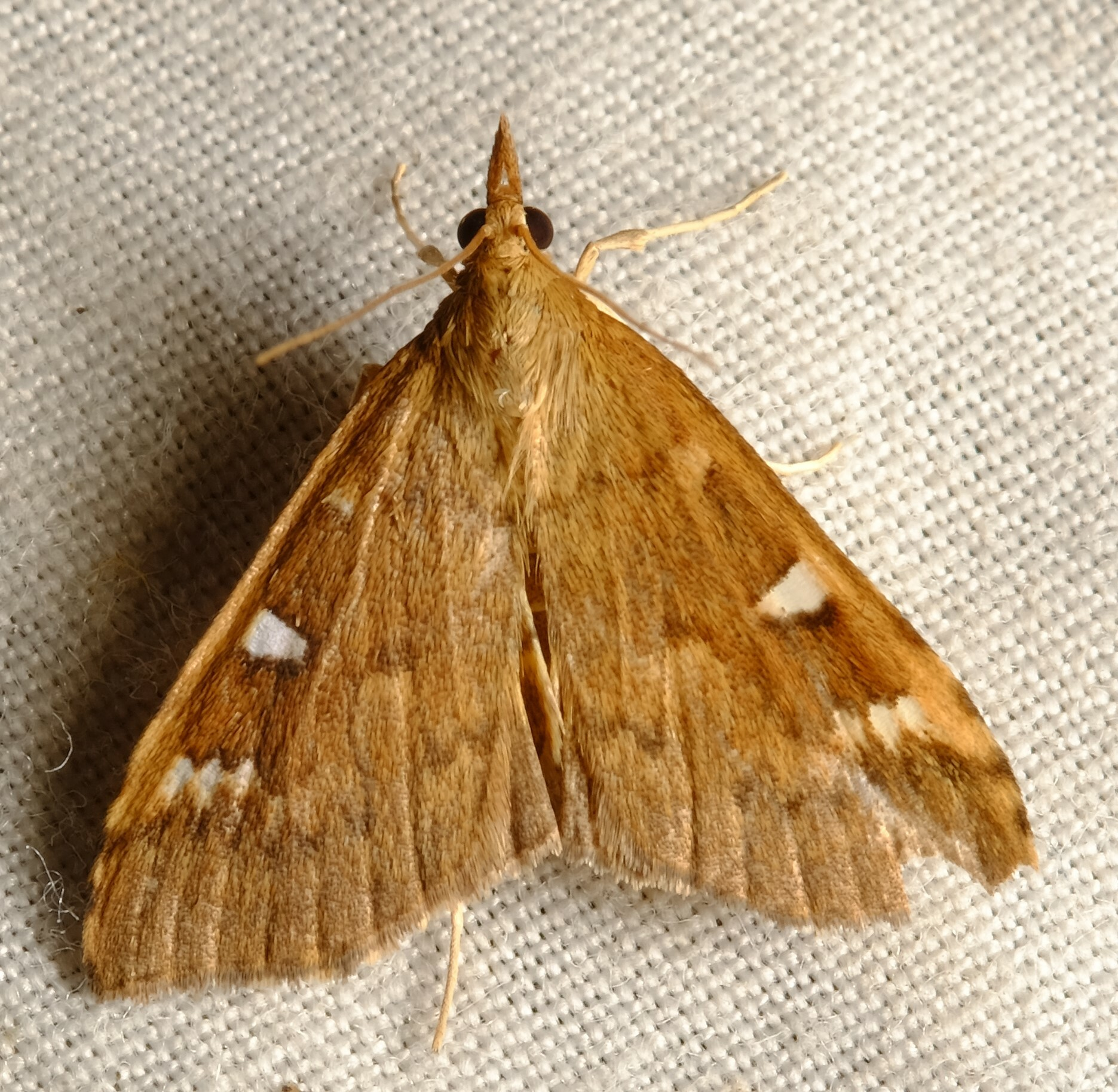

Scientific classification
- Kingdom: Animalia
- Phylum: Arthropoda
- Class: Insecta
- Order: Lepidoptera
- Family: Crambidae
- Genus: Udea
- Species: U. hyalistis

Binomial name
- Udea hyalistis (Lower, 1902)

Synonyms
- Pyrausta hyalistis Lower, 1902; Pyrausta diplosticta Turner, 1908

= Udea hyalistis =

Species of moth

Udea hyalistis is a moth in the family Crambidae. It was described by Oswald Bertram Lower in 1902. It is found in Australia, where it has been recorded from Victoria.

The wingspan is 22–26 mm. The forewings are pale brownish grey with a clear white median subcostal spot, edged with some darker scales. There is a similar spot narrower and twice constricted. The hindwings are ochreous whitish with some brownish-grey irroration (speckles), an antemedian dot and a subterminal band of the same colour.
