= Udea lerautalis =

Scientific classification
- Domain: Eukaryota
- Kingdom: Animalia
- Phylum: Arthropoda
- Class: Insecta
- Order: Lepidoptera
- Family: Crambidae
- Genus: Udea
- Species: U. lerautalis

Binomial name
- Udea lerautalis Tautel, 2014

Species of moth

Udea lerautalis is a moth in the family Crambidae. It was described by Claude Tautel in 2014. It is found on the Mediterranean island of Corsica.
