= Udea indistincta =

Scientific classification
- Kingdom: Animalia
- Phylum: Arthropoda
- Class: Insecta
- Order: Lepidoptera
- Family: Crambidae
- Genus: Udea
- Species: U. indistincta

Binomial name
- Udea indistincta (Butler, 1883)

Synonyms
- Scopula indistincta Butler, 1883

Species of moth

Udea indistincta is a moth in the family Crambidae. It was described by Arthur Gardiner Butler in 1883. It is found in Chile.

The wingspan is about 20 mm. The forewings are pale stramineous (straw coloured), with the blackish discoidal spots. The upper portion of the discal line is represented by a straight transverse series of black dots running from the fourth black costal spot to the second median branch. The lower portion is only represented by a few black scales between the end of the cell and the inner margin and the subbasal line is very oblique and represented by four black dots. The marginal dots are small. The hindwings have an imperfect discal grey stripe parallel to the outer margin, followed by a submarginal series of rather large grey spots and a marginal series of black dots.
