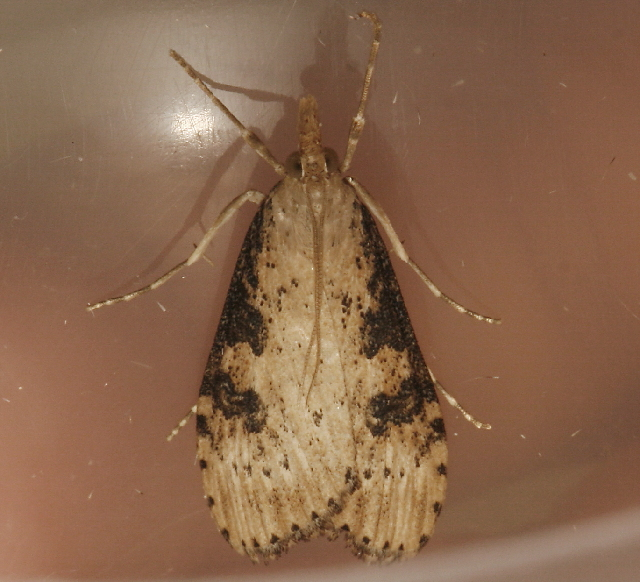

Scientific classification
- Kingdom: Animalia
- Phylum: Arthropoda
- Clade: Pancrustacea
- Class: Insecta
- Order: Lepidoptera
- Family: Crambidae
- Genus: Udea
- Species: U. livida

Binomial name
- Udea livida Munroe, 1966

= Udea livida =

Species of moth

Udea livida is a moth in the family Crambidae. It was described by Eugene G. Munroe in 1966. It is found in North America, where it has been recorded from British Columbia, Washington and Utah.
