= Udea tritalis =

Scientific classification
- Domain: Eukaryota
- Kingdom: Animalia
- Phylum: Arthropoda
- Class: Insecta
- Order: Lepidoptera
- Family: Crambidae
- Genus: Udea
- Species: U. tritalis

Binomial name
- Udea tritalis (Christoph, 1881)

Synonyms
- Botys tritalis Christoph, 1881

Species of moth

Udea tritalis is a moth in the family Crambidae. It was described by Hugo Theodor Christoph in 1881. It is found in the Russian Far East (Ussuri), Japan, Korea and northern China.
