= Udea delineatalis =

Scientific classification
- Kingdom: Animalia
- Phylum: Arthropoda
- Class: Insecta
- Order: Lepidoptera
- Family: Crambidae
- Genus: Udea
- Species: U. delineatalis

Binomial name
- Udea delineatalis (Walker in Melliss, 1875)

Synonyms
- Scopula delineatalis Walker in Melliss, 1875

Species of moth

Udea delineatalis is a moth in the family Crambidae. It was described by Francis Walker in 1875. It is found on Saint Helena. The habitat consists of open grassy slopes.
