= Udea poliostolalis =

Scientific classification
- Kingdom: Animalia
- Phylum: Arthropoda
- Class: Insecta
- Order: Lepidoptera
- Family: Crambidae
- Genus: Udea
- Species: U. poliostolalis

Binomial name
- Udea poliostolalis (Hampson, 1918)

Synonyms
- Hapalia poliostolalis Hampson, 1918

Species of moth

Udea poliostolalis is a moth in the family Crambidae. It was described by George Hampson in 1918. It is found in Taiwan.

The forewings are grey brown with a leaden gloss and with a faint erect brown antemedial line, as well as a faint dark discoidal bar. The postmedial line is rather diffused dark brown, very slightly waved, excurved from the costa to below vein 3, then retracted to below the angle of the cell and erect to the inner margin. The hindwings are grey brown with a leaden gloss.
