= Udea defectalis =

Scientific classification
- Domain: Eukaryota
- Kingdom: Animalia
- Phylum: Arthropoda
- Class: Insecta
- Order: Lepidoptera
- Family: Crambidae
- Genus: Udea
- Species: U. defectalis

Binomial name
- Udea defectalis (Sauber, 1899)

Synonyms
- Botys defectalis Sauber, 1899

Species of moth

Udea defectalis is a moth in the family Crambidae. It was described by Sauber in 1899. It is found in China.
