= Udea karagaialis =

Scientific classification
- Domain: Eukaryota
- Kingdom: Animalia
- Phylum: Arthropoda
- Class: Insecta
- Order: Lepidoptera
- Family: Crambidae
- Genus: Udea
- Species: U. karagaialis

Binomial name
- Udea karagaialis (Caradja, 1916)

Synonyms
- Pionea fulcrialis var. karagaialis Caradja, 1916

Species of moth

Udea karagaialis is a moth in the family Crambidae. It was described by Aristide Caradja in 1916. It is found in Kyrgyzstan.
