= Udea infuscalis =

Scientific classification
- Kingdom: Animalia
- Phylum: Arthropoda
- Clade: Pancrustacea
- Class: Insecta
- Order: Lepidoptera
- Family: Crambidae
- Genus: Udea
- Species: U. infuscalis

Binomial name
- Udea infuscalis (Zeller, 1852)

Synonyms
- Botys infuscalis Zeller, 1852

Species of moth

Udea infuscalis is a moth in the family Crambidae. It was described by Zeller in 1852. It is found in South Africa (KwaZulu-Natal, Gauteng).
