= Udea scoparialis =

Scientific classification
- Kingdom: Animalia
- Phylum: Arthropoda
- Class: Insecta
- Order: Lepidoptera
- Family: Crambidae
- Genus: Udea
- Species: U. scoparialis

Binomial name
- Udea scoparialis (Hampson, 1899)

Synonyms
- Pionea scoparialis Hampson, 1899; Mimudea scoparialis

Species of moth

Udea scoparialis is a moth in the family Crambidae. It was described by George Hampson in 1899. It is found in Tibet, China.

The wingspan is about 24 mm. The forewings are grey white, thickly irrorated (sprinkled) and suffused with grey brown to beyond the middle and on the terminal area, leaving a slightly irrorated broad postmedial whitish band. There is an obscure antemedial waved white line, curled outwards and forming a hook above the inner margin. The orbicular and reniform are very large, defined by black, and with black centers. There is a postmedial black speck on the costa, followed by an obliquely curved minutely waved line. There is also a terminal series of black points. The hindwings are white with black points at the two angles of the cell and an indistinct curved postmedial line and an apical fuscous patch extending to vein 2. There is also a terminal series of black points.
