= Udea poasalis =

Scientific classification
- Domain: Eukaryota
- Kingdom: Animalia
- Phylum: Arthropoda
- Class: Insecta
- Order: Lepidoptera
- Family: Crambidae
- Genus: Udea
- Species: U. poasalis

Binomial name
- Udea poasalis (Schaus, 1912)

Synonyms
- Pionea poasalis Schaus, 1912

Species of moth

Udea poasalis is a moth in the family Crambidae. It was described by Schaus in 1912. It is found in Costa Rica.

The wingspan is about 25 mm. The forewings are greyish buff, thinly scaled below the cell and with a few scattered black irrorations. There is a large fuscous shade in the middle of the cell, extending above the subcostal. There is a similar shade at the end of the cell, with a white point at the lower angle of the discocellular. There is also an indistinct, finely dentate, outer line remote from the cell, followed by a vague subterminal darker shade, as well as terminal black points. The hindwings are thinly scaled and white with an indistinct fine postmedial line, the termen faintly tinged with light brown and there are some terminal dark points.
