= Udea thermantis =

Scientific classification
- Kingdom: Animalia
- Phylum: Arthropoda
- Class: Insecta
- Order: Lepidoptera
- Family: Crambidae
- Genus: Udea
- Species: U. thermantis

Binomial name
- Udea thermantis (Meyrick, 1899)

Synonyms
- Pyrausta thermantis Meyrick, 1899; Oeobia thermantis

Species of moth

Udea thermantis is a moth of the family Crambidae. It is endemic to the Hawaiian islands of Kauai, Oahu, Molokai, Maui and Hawaii.
