= Udea subplanalis =

Scientific classification
- Kingdom: Animalia
- Phylum: Arthropoda
- Class: Insecta
- Order: Lepidoptera
- Family: Crambidae
- Genus: Udea
- Species: U. subplanalis

Binomial name
- Udea subplanalis (Caradja in Caradja & Meyrick, 1937)

Synonyms
- Pionea subplanalis Caradja in Caradja & Meyrick, 1937

Species of moth

Udea subplanalis is a moth in the family Crambidae. It was described by Aristide Caradja in 1937. It is found in Yunnan, China.
