= Udea lenta =

Scientific classification
- Kingdom: Animalia
- Phylum: Arthropoda
- Class: Insecta
- Order: Lepidoptera
- Family: Crambidae
- Genus: Udea
- Species: U. lenta

Binomial name
- Udea lenta (Meyrick, 1936)

Synonyms
- Phlyctaenia lenta Meyrick, 1936

Species of moth

Udea lenta is a moth in the family Crambidae. It was described by Edward Meyrick in 1936. It is found in Venezuela.
