= Udea rusticalis =

Scientific classification
- Domain: Eukaryota
- Kingdom: Animalia
- Phylum: Arthropoda
- Class: Insecta
- Order: Lepidoptera
- Family: Crambidae
- Genus: Udea
- Species: U. rusticalis

Binomial name
- Udea rusticalis (Barnes & McDunnough, 1914)

Synonyms
- Phlyctaenia rusticalis Barnes & McDunnough, 1914

Species of moth

Udea rusticalis is a moth in the family Crambidae. It was described by William Barnes and James Halliday McDunnough in 1914. It is found in North America, where it has been recorded from Arizona.

The wingspan is about 22 mm. The forewings are light gray, heavily sprinkled and shaded with liver brown, especially along the costa and in patches below the apex and above the anal angle, which are entirely this color. There is an indistinct, dark line, outwardly oblique to below the cell, then slightly waved to the inner margin. There is also an orbicular round brown blotch and the reniform has the form of a figure of eight, filled with brown with a white dot in lower the portion. There is another line, which is brown, denticulate, arising from a small costal patch, evenly rounded opposite the cell, forming a strong sinus above vein 2, reaching to below the reniform, slightly bordered outwardly with whitish. There is also a terminal row of blackish dashes interrupted by pale ochreous dots. The hindwings are smoky.
