= Udea nigripunctata =

Scientific classification
- Domain: Eukaryota
- Kingdom: Animalia
- Phylum: Arthropoda
- Class: Insecta
- Order: Lepidoptera
- Family: Crambidae
- Genus: Udea
- Species: U. nigripunctata

Binomial name
- Udea nigripunctata Warren, 1892

Species of moth

Udea nigripunctata is a moth in the family Crambidae. It was described by William Warren in 1892. It is found in Peru.

The wingspan is about 16 mm. The forewings are dull fuscous. The first line is indistinct and curved and the second line is fine, black and consists of small blunt denticulations (tooth-like marks), each followed by a paler space. There is a series of very minute black dots or points before the fringes, which are concolorous with the wing. The orbicular stigma is small and indistinct and the reniform is black and conspicuous. The hindwings are rather paler, without distinct markings.
