= Udea coranialis =

Scientific classification
- Domain: Eukaryota
- Kingdom: Animalia
- Phylum: Arthropoda
- Class: Insecta
- Order: Lepidoptera
- Family: Crambidae
- Genus: Udea
- Species: U. coranialis

Binomial name
- Udea coranialis Munroe, 1967

Species of moth

Udea coranialis is a moth in the family Crambidae. It was described by Eugene G. Munroe in 1967. It is found in Bolivia.
