= Udea lampadias =

Scientific classification
- Kingdom: Animalia
- Phylum: Arthropoda
- Class: Insecta
- Order: Lepidoptera
- Family: Crambidae
- Genus: Udea
- Species: U. lampadias

Binomial name
- Udea lampadias (Meyrick, 1904)

Synonyms
- Phlyctaenia lampadias Meyrick, 1904; Oeobia lampadias

Species of moth

Udea lampadias is a moth of the family Crambidae. It is endemic to the Hawaiian islands of Maui and Hawaii.
