= Udea crambialis =

Scientific classification
- Domain: Eukaryota
- Kingdom: Animalia
- Phylum: Arthropoda
- Class: Insecta
- Order: Lepidoptera
- Family: Crambidae
- Genus: Udea
- Species: U. crambialis

Binomial name
- Udea crambialis (H. Druce, 1899)

Synonyms
- Pionea crambialis H. Druce, 1899

Species of moth

Udea crambialis is a moth in the family Crambidae. It was described by Herbert Druce in 1899. It is found in Orizaba, Mexico.
