= Udea angustalis =

Scientific classification
- Domain: Eukaryota
- Kingdom: Animalia
- Phylum: Arthropoda
- Class: Insecta
- Order: Lepidoptera
- Family: Crambidae
- Genus: Udea
- Species: U. angustalis

Binomial name
- Udea angustalis (Dognin, 1905)

Synonyms
- Cybolomia angustalis Dognin, 1905; Hapalia nigristriatalis Hampson, 1918

Species of moth

Udea angustalis is a moth in the family Crambidae. It was described by Paul Dognin in 1905. It is found from southern Mexico to Ecuador's Loja Province, Colombia and Bolivia.

The wingspan is about 22 mm.
