= Udea scorialis =

Scientific classification
- Kingdom: Animalia
- Phylum: Arthropoda
- Clade: Pancrustacea
- Class: Insecta
- Order: Lepidoptera
- Family: Crambidae
- Genus: Udea
- Species: U. scorialis

Binomial name
- Udea scorialis (Zeller, 1847)

Synonyms
- Scopula scorialis Zeller, 1847

Species of moth

Udea scorialis is a species of moth in the family Crambidae. It is found on Sicily.
