= Udea renalis =

Scientific classification
- Domain: Eukaryota
- Kingdom: Animalia
- Phylum: Arthropoda
- Class: Insecta
- Order: Lepidoptera
- Family: Crambidae
- Genus: Udea
- Species: U. renalis

Binomial name
- Udea renalis Moore, 1888

Species of moth

Udea renalis is a moth in the family Crambidae. It was described by Frederic Moore in 1888. It is found in India in Darjeeling and Sikkim.
