= Udea umbriferalis =

Scientific classification
- Kingdom: Animalia
- Phylum: Arthropoda
- Class: Insecta
- Order: Lepidoptera
- Family: Crambidae
- Genus: Udea
- Species: U. umbriferalis

Binomial name
- Udea umbriferalis (Hampson, 1918)

Synonyms
- Hapalia umbriferalis Hampson, 1918

Species of moth

Udea umbriferalis is a moth in the family Crambidae. It was described by George Hampson in 1918. It is found in Peru and Bolivia.

The wingspan is about 22 mm. The forewings are rufous suffused with dark brown, the costal area bright rufous except towards the base, with three small black spots on the costa towards the apex. The antemedial line is black-brown, angled outwards below the costa, excurved below the cell and angled inwards above the inner margin, defined on inner side by whitish below the cell. There is a small black annulus in the upper part of the middle of the cell and a discoidal figure-of-eight shaped mark, its upper and lower parts filled in with rufous, the rufous from the costa extending into the cell before it. The postmedial line is black-brown defined on the outer side by whitish, strong and obliquely downcurved to vein 6, then excurved and minutely dentate to vein 2 where it is retracted to below the angle of the cell and bent outwards below the submedian fold. There is a terminal series of minute black spots with whitish striae between them. The hindwings are red-brown, rather darker at the termen on which there is a series of minute blackish points.
