= Udea caminopis =

Scientific classification
- Kingdom: Animalia
- Phylum: Arthropoda
- Class: Insecta
- Order: Lepidoptera
- Family: Crambidae
- Genus: Udea
- Species: U. caminopis

Binomial name
- Udea caminopis (Meyrick, 1899)

Synonyms
- Phlyctaenia caminopis Meyrick, 1899; Oeobia caminopis

Species of moth

Udea caminopis is a moth of the family Crambidae. It is endemic to the Hawaiian islands of Oahu, Molokai and Hawaii.

The larvae feed on Geniostoma species.
