= Udea kusnezovi =

Scientific classification
- Kingdom: Animalia
- Phylum: Arthropoda
- Clade: Pancrustacea
- Class: Insecta
- Order: Lepidoptera
- Family: Crambidae
- Genus: Udea
- Species: U. kusnezovi

Binomial name
- Udea kusnezovi Sinev, 2008

Species of moth

Udea kusnezovi is a moth in the family Crambidae. It is found in Russia.
