= Udea platyleuca =

Scientific classification
- Kingdom: Animalia
- Phylum: Arthropoda
- Class: Insecta
- Order: Lepidoptera
- Family: Crambidae
- Genus: Udea
- Species: U. platyleuca

Binomial name
- Udea platyleuca (Meyrick, 1899)

Synonyms
- Phlyctaenia platyleuca Meyrick, 1899; Oeobia platyleuca

Species of moth

Udea platyleuca is a moth of the family Crambidae. It is endemic to the Hawaiian islands of Oahu, Molokai, Maui and Hawaii.

The larvae feed on Touchardia latifolia and Urera sandwicensis.
