= Udea khorassanalis =

Scientific classification
- Domain: Eukaryota
- Kingdom: Animalia
- Phylum: Arthropoda
- Class: Insecta
- Order: Lepidoptera
- Family: Crambidae
- Genus: Udea
- Species: U. khorassanalis

Binomial name
- Udea khorassanalis (Amsel, 1950)

Synonyms
- Pionea khorassanalis Amsel, 1950

Species of moth

Udea khorassanalis is a moth in the family Crambidae. It is found in Iran.
