= Udea brontias =

Scientific classification
- Kingdom: Animalia
- Phylum: Arthropoda
- Class: Insecta
- Order: Lepidoptera
- Family: Crambidae
- Genus: Udea
- Species: U. brontias

Binomial name
- Udea brontias (Meyrick, 1899)

Synonyms
- Pyrausta brontias Meyrick, 1899; Oeobia brontias

Species of moth

Udea brontias is a moth of the family Crambidae. It is endemic to the Hawaiian island of Kauai.
