= Udea melanosticta =

Scientific classification
- Kingdom: Animalia
- Phylum: Arthropoda
- Class: Insecta
- Order: Lepidoptera
- Family: Crambidae
- Genus: Udea
- Species: U. melanosticta

Binomial name
- Udea melanosticta (Butler, 1883)

Synonyms
- Scopula melanosticta Butler, 1883

Species of moth

Udea melanosticta is a moth in the family Crambidae. It was described by Arthur Gardiner Butler in 1883. It is found in Chile.

The wingspan is about 22 mm. The forewings are white but slightly tinged with stramineous (straw colour), with black discoidal spots. The lines are indistinct and the external border is greyish brown, with a submarginal series of blackish spots and black marginal dots. The hindwings have a brownish external border and black dots at the end of the cell and along the outer margin.
