= Udea chloropis =

Scientific classification
- Kingdom: Animalia
- Phylum: Arthropoda
- Class: Insecta
- Order: Lepidoptera
- Family: Crambidae
- Genus: Udea
- Species: U. chloropis

Binomial name
- Udea chloropis (Meyrick, 1899)

Synonyms
- Pyrausta chloropis Meyrick, 1899; Oeobia chloropis

Species of moth

Udea chloropis is a moth of the family Crambidae. It is endemic to the Hawaiian islands of Kauai and Hawaii.
