= Udea secticostalis =

Scientific classification
- Kingdom: Animalia
- Phylum: Arthropoda
- Class: Insecta
- Order: Lepidoptera
- Family: Crambidae
- Genus: Udea
- Species: U. secticostalis

Binomial name
- Udea secticostalis (Hampson, 1913)

Synonyms
- Pionea secticostalis Hampson, 1913

Species of moth

Udea secticostalis is a moth in the family Crambidae. It was described by George Hampson in 1913. It is found in Paraguay and Argentina.

The wingspan is about 18 mm. The forewings are cupreous brown with traces of an oblique sinuous antemedial line and with a small white spot beyond it below the costa. There is an indistinct dark discoidal lunule with a small white spot in the centre and the terminal third of the costa has four short white streaks alternating with short black streaks. There is also an indistinct postmedial line excurved from the costa to vein 4, then incurved, as well as some slight black points on the apical half of the costa. The hindwings are pale cupreous brown, with traces of a curved postmedial line and a fine terminal line.
