= Udea melanopis =

Scientific classification
- Kingdom: Animalia
- Phylum: Arthropoda
- Class: Insecta
- Order: Lepidoptera
- Family: Crambidae
- Genus: Udea
- Species: U. melanopis

Binomial name
- Udea melanopis (Meyrick, 1899)

Synonyms
- Loxostege melanopis Meyrick, 1899; Oeobia melanopis

Species of moth

Udea melanopis is a moth of the family Crambidae. It is endemic to the island of Hawaii.
