= Udea violae =

Scientific classification
- Domain: Eukaryota
- Kingdom: Animalia
- Phylum: Arthropoda
- Class: Insecta
- Order: Lepidoptera
- Family: Crambidae
- Genus: Udea
- Species: U. violae

Binomial name
- Udea violae (Swezey, 1933)

Synonyms
- Phlyctaenia violae Swezey, 1933; Oeobia violae

Species of moth

Udea violae is a moth of the family Crambidae. It was described by Otto Herman Swezey in 1933 and is endemic to the Hawaiian island of Oahu.

The larvae feed on Viola species. Fully grown larvae are about 20 mm long and light green, with white dorsal fat bodies showing through. They spin up between leaves.

The pupal period lasts 26 days.
