= Udea fusculalis =

Scientific classification
- Kingdom: Animalia
- Phylum: Arthropoda
- Class: Insecta
- Order: Lepidoptera
- Family: Crambidae
- Genus: Udea
- Species: U. fusculalis

Binomial name
- Udea fusculalis (Hampson, 1899)

Synonyms
- Pionea fusculalis Hampson, 1899; Mimudea fusculalis; Udea fusculalis impunctalis Dognin, 1912

Species of moth

Udea fusculalis is a moth in the family Crambidae. It was described by George Hampson in 1899. It is found in Mexico (Orizaba), Peru and Loja Province, Ecuador.

The wingspan is about 24 mm. The forewings are brown, with an antemedial waved black line, angled below the cell. There is a discoidal black lunule and a postmedial minutely-dentate black line, excurved to vein 2, below which it is angled inwards almost to the cell, the bent outwards again. The hindwings are fuscous, with two black points on the discocellulars. The postmedial line is excurved between veins 5 and 2. Both wings have a terminal series of black points.
