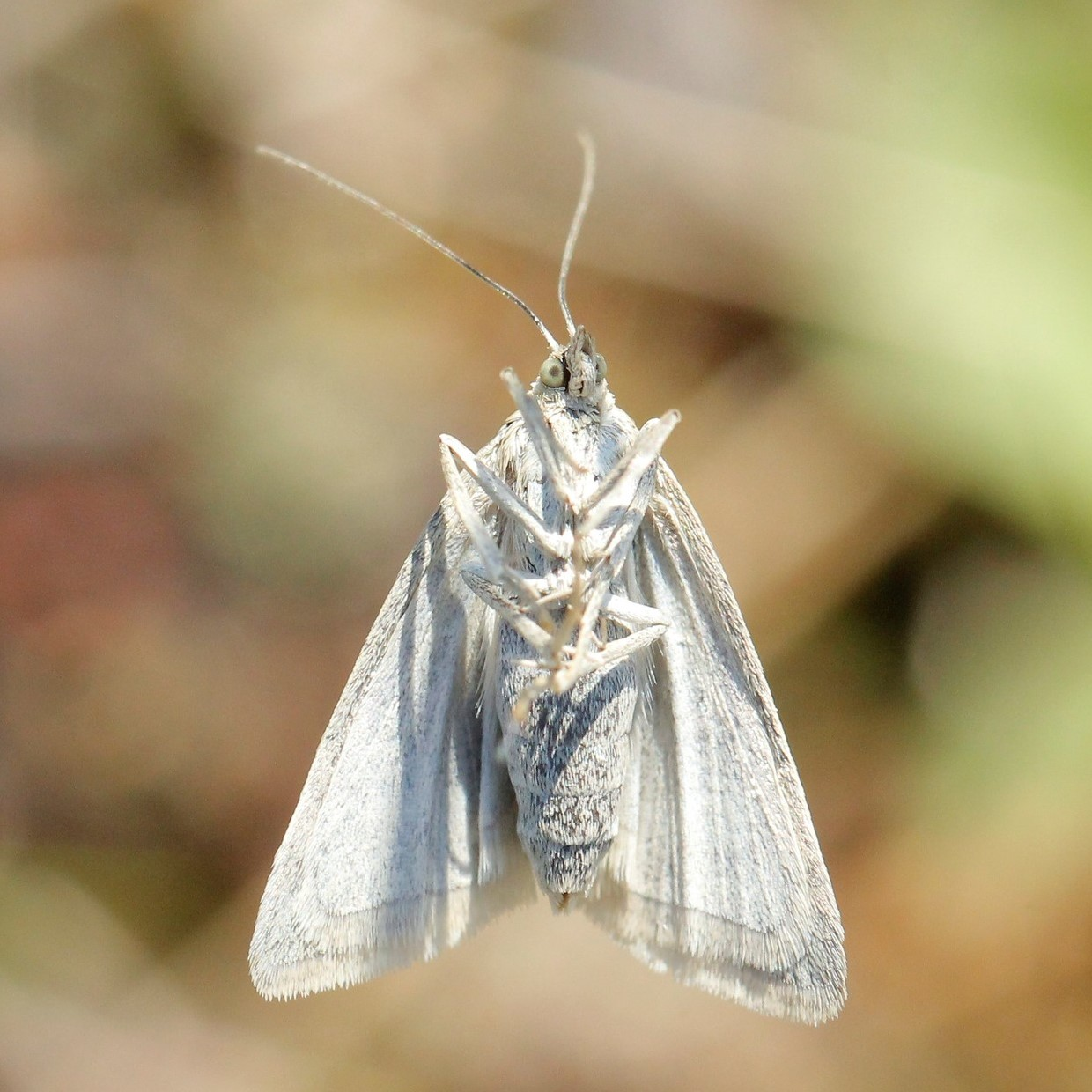

Scientific classification
- Kingdom: Animalia
- Phylum: Arthropoda
- Class: Insecta
- Order: Lepidoptera
- Family: Crambidae
- Genus: Udea
- Species: U. uralica

Binomial name
- Udea uralica Slamka, 2013

= Udea uralica =

Species of moth

Udea uralica is a species of moth in the family Crambidae. It was described by Slamka in 2013. It is found on the Asiatic slopes of the polar Ural Mountains, the Altai Mountains and Sayan Mountains. The habitat consists of willow-grass tundra.
