= Udea sabulosalis =

Scientific classification
- Kingdom: Animalia
- Phylum: Arthropoda
- Class: Insecta
- Order: Lepidoptera
- Family: Crambidae
- Genus: Udea
- Species: U. sabulosalis

Binomial name
- Udea sabulosalis Warren, 1892

Species of moth

Udea sabulosalis is a moth in the family Crambidae. It was described by William Warren in 1892. It is found in Chile.

The wingspan is about 26 mm. The forewings are whitish ochreous, dusted with dull rust, most thickly in the submarginal area and along the costa. The stigmata is large and filled up with the same colour and united to the costal streak. The first line is hardly visible, touching the inside of the orbicular stigma and the second line is ferruginous, runs near to and nearly parallel with the hindmargin, only making a small indentation above the inner margin. There are four dull ferruginous subapical costal dashes. The hindwings are uniform whitish ochreous.
