= Udea swezeyi =

Scientific classification
- Domain: Eukaryota
- Kingdom: Animalia
- Phylum: Arthropoda
- Class: Insecta
- Order: Lepidoptera
- Family: Crambidae
- Genus: Udea
- Species: U. swezeyi

Binomial name
- Udea swezeyi (Zimmerman, 1951)

Synonyms
- Protaulacistis swezeyi Zimmerman, 1951; Oeobia swezeyi

Species of moth

Udea swezeyi is a moth of the family Crambidae. It is endemic to the Hawaiian island of Kauai.
