= Udea inhospitalis =

Scientific classification
- Domain: Eukaryota
- Kingdom: Animalia
- Phylum: Arthropoda
- Class: Insecta
- Order: Lepidoptera
- Family: Crambidae
- Genus: Udea
- Species: U. inhospitalis

Binomial name
- Udea inhospitalis Warren, 1892

Species of moth

Udea inhospitalis is a moth in the family Crambidae. It was described by William Warren in 1892. It is found in Patagonia.

The wingspan is 18–20 mm. Both wings are dark glossy fuscous, with markings that are only just distinguishable.
