= Udea ommatias =

Scientific classification
- Kingdom: Animalia
- Phylum: Arthropoda
- Class: Insecta
- Order: Lepidoptera
- Family: Crambidae
- Genus: Udea
- Species: U. ommatias

Binomial name
- Udea ommatias (Meyrick, 1899)

Synonyms
- Oeobia ommatias; Phlyctaenia ommatias Meyrick, 1899

Species of moth

Udea ommatias is a moth of the family Crambidae. It is endemic to the Hawaiian islands of Kauai, Oahu and Molokai.

The larvae feed on Dubautia laxa and Dubautia plantaginea.
