= Udea conubialis =

Scientific classification
- Domain: Eukaryota
- Kingdom: Animalia
- Phylum: Arthropoda
- Class: Insecta
- Order: Lepidoptera
- Family: Crambidae
- Genus: Udea
- Species: U. conubialis

Binomial name
- Udea conubialis Yamanaka, 1972

Species of moth

Udea conubialis is a moth in the family Crambidae. It was described by Hiroshi Yamanaka in 1972. It is found in Taiwan.
