= Udea phaealis =

Scientific classification
- Kingdom: Animalia
- Phylum: Arthropoda
- Class: Insecta
- Order: Lepidoptera
- Family: Crambidae
- Genus: Udea
- Species: U. phaealis

Binomial name
- Udea phaealis (Hampson, 1899)

Synonyms
- Pionea phaealis Hampson, 1899; Mimudea phaealis

Species of moth

Udea phaealis is a moth in the family Crambidae. It was described by George Hampson in 1899. It is found in Orizaba, Mexico.

The wingspan is about 20 mm. The forewings are dark brown, irrorated (sprinkled) and suffused with black. There is an indistinct sinuous antemedial line, angled outwards below the cell. There are oblique black annuli at the middle of the cell and on the discocellulars and the postmedial line is defined by ochreous on the outer side, excurved between veins 6 and 2, then retracted to below the angle of the cell. There are some black points on the costa towards the apex and a terminal series of ochreous points. The hindwings are fuscous, with two dark points on the discocellulars and traces of a postmedial line, excurved between veins 5 and 2. There is also a terminal series of black points.
