= Udea amitina =

Scientific classification
- Kingdom: Animalia
- Phylum: Arthropoda
- Class: Insecta
- Order: Lepidoptera
- Family: Crambidae
- Genus: Udea
- Species: U. amitina

Binomial name
- Udea amitina (Butler, 1883)

Synonyms
- Scopula amitina Butler, 1883

Species of moth

Udea amitina is a moth in the family Crambidae. It was described by Arthur Gardiner Butler in 1883. It is found in Chile.

The wingspan is about 22 mm. Adults are similar to Udea fulvalis, with the same colours, but the lines across the forewings are much more slender and the hindwings are whiter, and consequently there is a more distinct abbreviated grey discal line. The forewings of the females are clouded.
