= Udea viridalis =

Scientific classification
- Kingdom: Animalia
- Phylum: Arthropoda
- Clade: Pancrustacea
- Class: Insecta
- Order: Lepidoptera
- Family: Crambidae
- Genus: Udea
- Species: U. viridalis

Binomial name
- Udea viridalis (Dognin, 1904)

Synonyms
- Pionea viridalis Dognin, 1904

Species of moth

Udea viridalis is a moth in the family Crambidae. It was described by Paul Dognin in 1904. It is found in Ecuador.
