= Udea phaethontia =

Scientific classification
- Kingdom: Animalia
- Phylum: Arthropoda
- Class: Insecta
- Order: Lepidoptera
- Family: Crambidae
- Genus: Udea
- Species: U. phaethontia

Binomial name
- Udea phaethontia (Meyrick, 1899)

Synonyms
- Pyrausta phaethontia Meyrick, 1899; Oeobia phaethontia

Species of moth

Udea phaethontia is a moth of the family Crambidae. It is endemic to the island of Hawaii.
