= Udea sobrinalis =

Scientific classification
- Domain: Eukaryota
- Kingdom: Animalia
- Phylum: Arthropoda
- Class: Insecta
- Order: Lepidoptera
- Family: Crambidae
- Genus: Udea
- Species: U. sobrinalis

Binomial name
- Udea sobrinalis (Guenée, 1854)

Synonyms
- Ebulea sobrinalis Guenée, 1854

Species of moth

Udea sobrinalis is a moth in the family Crambidae. It was described by Achille Guenée in 1854. It is found in French Guiana.
