= Udea latipennalis =

Scientific classification
- Domain: Eukaryota
- Kingdom: Animalia
- Phylum: Arthropoda
- Class: Insecta
- Order: Lepidoptera
- Family: Crambidae
- Genus: Udea
- Species: U. latipennalis

Binomial name
- Udea latipennalis (Caradja, 1928)

Synonyms
- Pionea latipennalis Caradja, 1928

Species of moth

Udea latipennalis is a moth in the family Crambidae. It was described by Aristide Caradja in 1928. It is found in Mongolia.
