= Udea stationalis =

Scientific classification
- Domain: Eukaryota
- Kingdom: Animalia
- Phylum: Arthropoda
- Class: Insecta
- Order: Lepidoptera
- Family: Crambidae
- Genus: Udea
- Species: U. stationalis

Binomial name
- Udea stationalis Yamanaka, 1988

Species of moth

Udea stationalis is a moth in the family Crambidae. It was described by Hiroshi Yamanaka in 1988. It is found on the island of Honshu in Japan and in the province of Fujian in China.

The wingspan is 15–20 mm.
