= Udea aurora =

Scientific classification
- Domain: Eukaryota
- Kingdom: Animalia
- Phylum: Arthropoda
- Class: Insecta
- Order: Lepidoptera
- Family: Crambidae
- Genus: Udea
- Species: U. aurora

Binomial name
- Udea aurora (Butler, 1881)

Synonyms
- Anemosa aurora Butler, 1881; Mecyna aurora; Oeobia aurora; Pionea aurora

Species of moth

Udea aurora is a moth of the family Crambidae. It is endemic to the Hawaiian islands of Kauai and Oahu.

The larvae feed on Bidens species. They feed between spun-together leaves. The pupa is about 10 mm long.
