= Udea sheppardi =

Scientific classification
- Domain: Eukaryota
- Kingdom: Animalia
- Phylum: Arthropoda
- Class: Insecta
- Order: Lepidoptera
- Family: Crambidae
- Genus: Udea
- Species: U. sheppardi

Binomial name
- Udea sheppardi (McDunnough, 1929)

Synonyms
- Phlyctaenia sheppardi McDunnough, 1929

Species of moth

Udea sheppardi is a moth in the family Crambidae. It was described by James Halliday McDunnough in 1929. It is found in North America, where it has been recorded from Idaho, Maine, New York, Newfoundland and Quebec.
