= Udea beringialis =

Scientific classification
- Domain: Eukaryota
- Kingdom: Animalia
- Phylum: Arthropoda
- Class: Insecta
- Order: Lepidoptera
- Family: Crambidae
- Genus: Udea
- Species: U. beringialis

Binomial name
- Udea beringialis Munroe, 1966

Species of moth

Udea beringialis is a moth in the family Crambidae. It was described by Eugene G. Munroe in 1966. It is found in North America, where it has been recorded from Alaska, Alberta, British Columbia, Manitoba and the Yukon Territory.
