= Udea chalcophanes =

Scientific classification
- Domain: Eukaryota
- Kingdom: Animalia
- Phylum: Arthropoda
- Class: Insecta
- Order: Lepidoptera
- Family: Crambidae
- Genus: Udea
- Species: U. chalcophanes

Binomial name
- Udea chalcophanes (Meyrick, 1899)

Synonyms
- Phlyctaenia chalcophanes Meyrick, 1899; Oeobia chalcophanes

Species of insect

Udea chalcophanes is a moth of the family Crambidae. It is endemic to the Hawaiian islands of Oahu, Maui and Hawaii.

The larvae feed on the leaves of Touchardia latifolia.
