= Udea lagunalis =

Scientific classification
- Domain: Eukaryota
- Kingdom: Animalia
- Phylum: Arthropoda
- Class: Insecta
- Order: Lepidoptera
- Family: Crambidae
- Genus: Udea
- Species: U. lagunalis

Binomial name
- Udea lagunalis (Schaus, 1913)

Synonyms
- Pionea lagunalis Schaus, 1913

Species of moth

Udea lagunalis is a moth in the family Crambidae. It is found in Costa Rica.
