= Udea gigantalis =

Scientific classification
- Domain: Eukaryota
- Kingdom: Animalia
- Phylum: Arthropoda
- Class: Insecta
- Order: Lepidoptera
- Family: Crambidae
- Genus: Udea
- Species: U. gigantalis

Binomial name
- Udea gigantalis Dognin, 1912

Species of moth

Udea gigantalis is a moth in the family Crambidae. It was described by Paul Dognin in 1912. It is found in Colombia.
