= Udea abstrusa =

Scientific classification
- Domain: Eukaryota
- Kingdom: Animalia
- Phylum: Arthropoda
- Class: Insecta
- Order: Lepidoptera
- Family: Crambidae
- Genus: Udea
- Species: U. abstrusa

Binomial name
- Udea abstrusa Munroe, 1966

Species of moth

Udea abstrusa is a moth in the family Crambidae. It was described by Eugene G. Munroe in 1966. It is found in North America, where it has been recorded from Alberta, British Columbia, Colorado, New Mexico, the Northwest Territory, Washington and Wyoming.

The wingspan is about 22 mm. Adults have been recorded on wing in July and August.

== Subspecies ==
- Udea abstrusa abstrusa (Alberta, Manitoba, Saskatchewan)
- Udea abstrusa cordilleralis Munroe, 1966 (Wyoming, Colorado, Utah, New Mexico)
- Udea abstrusa pullmanensis Munroe, 1966 (Washington)
- Udea abstrusa subarctica Munroe, 1966 (Yukon, Northwest Territories)
