= Udea cretacea =

Scientific classification
- Domain: Eukaryota
- Kingdom: Animalia
- Phylum: Arthropoda
- Class: Insecta
- Order: Lepidoptera
- Family: Crambidae
- Genus: Udea
- Species: U. cretacea

Binomial name
- Udea cretacea (Filipjev, 1925)

Synonyms
- Pyrausta cretacea Filipjev, 1925

Species of moth

Udea cretacea is a moth in the family Crambidae. It was described by Ivan Nikolayevich Filipjev in 1925. It is found in Georgia and Russia (Caucasus).
