= Udea calliastra =

Scientific classification
- Kingdom: Animalia
- Phylum: Arthropoda
- Class: Insecta
- Order: Lepidoptera
- Family: Crambidae
- Genus: Udea
- Species: U. calliastra

Binomial name
- Udea calliastra (Meyrick, 1899)

Synonyms
- Oeobia calliastra; Phlyctaenia calliastra Meyrick, 1899; Oeobia hyadnthias; Phlyctaenia hyadnthias Meyrick, 1899; Oeobia synastra; Phlyctaenia synastra Meyrick, 1899

Species of moth

Udea calliastra is a moth of the family Crambidae. It is endemic to the Hawaiian islands of Maui, Kauai, Molokai, Oahu and Hawaii.

The larvae of subspecies U. c. synastra feed on Peperomia latifolia and Peperomia membranacea.

== Subspecies ==
- Udea calliastra calliastra (Kauai)
- Udea calliastra hyadnthias Meyrick, 1899 (Molokai, Maui)
- Udea calliastra synastra Meyrick, 1899 (Oahu, Molokai, Hawaii)
