= Udea absolutalis =

Scientific classification
- Kingdom: Animalia
- Phylum: Arthropoda
- Class: Insecta
- Order: Lepidoptera
- Family: Crambidae
- Genus: Udea
- Species: U. absolutalis

Binomial name
- Udea absolutalis (Dyar, 1913)

Synonyms
- Nomophila absolutalis Dyar, 1913

Species of moth

Udea absolutalis is a moth in the family Crambidae. It was described by Harrison Gray Dyar Jr. in 1913. It is found in Guyana.

The wingspan is about 17 mm. The forewings are uniform dark grey, the discal dots represented by blackish clouds. The orbicular spot is small and the reniform spot is large. There are three yellowish dashes at the apex of the costa. The hindwings are translucent whitish, the veins and margin narrowly grey and the apex a little more extensively so.
