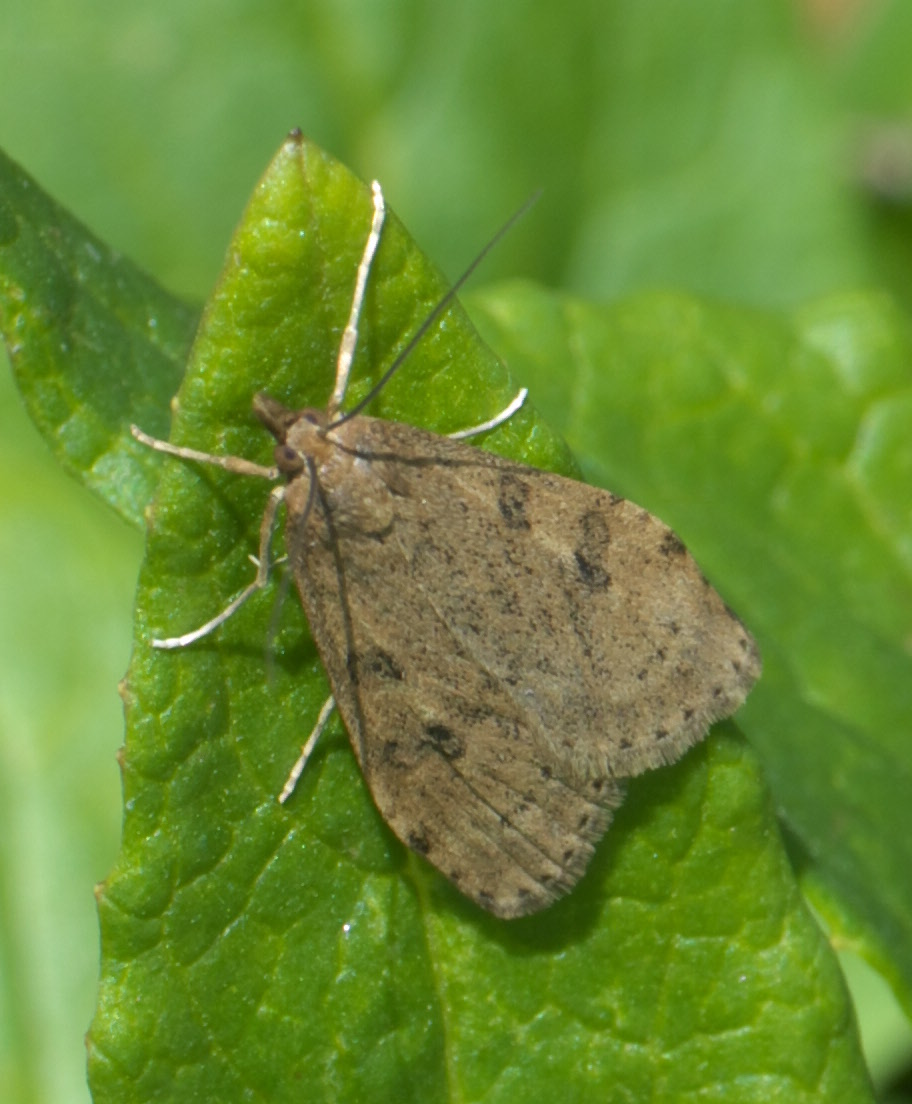

Scientific classification
- Kingdom: Animalia
- Phylum: Arthropoda
- Clade: Pancrustacea
- Class: Insecta
- Order: Lepidoptera
- Family: Crambidae
- Genus: Udea
- Species: U. turmalis

Binomial name
- Udea turmalis (Grote, 1881)

Synonyms
- Botis turmalis Grote, 1881

= Udea turmalis =

Species of moth

Udea turmalis is a moth in the family Crambidae. It was described by Augustus Radcliffe Grote in 1881. It is found in North America, where it has been recorded from Alberta, Arizona, British Columbia, California, Colorado, Idaho, Manitoba, Montana, Nevada, New Mexico, Utah and Washington.

The wingspan is 24–27 mm. Adults are pale dusty ochreous, the costa of the forewings broadly washed with blackish brown, absorbing the rather large dark discal spots. There is an exterior dotted line and a terminal series of blackish dots. The hindwings have a terminal dotted line before the fringes and an extra mesial dotted line, as well as a discal dot. Adults are on wing from June to September.

== Subspecies ==
- Udea turmalis turmalis (Colorado)
- Udea turmalis catronalis Munroe, 1966 (New Mexico)
- Udea turmalis griseor Munroe, 1966 (California)
- Udea turmalis tularensis Munroe, 1966 (California)
