= Udea cataphaea =

Scientific classification
- Kingdom: Animalia
- Phylum: Arthropoda
- Class: Insecta
- Order: Lepidoptera
- Family: Crambidae
- Genus: Udea
- Species: U. cataphaea

Binomial name
- Udea cataphaea (Meyrick, 1899)

Synonyms
- Protaulacistis cataphaea Meyrick, 1899; Oeobia cataphaea

Species of moth

Udea cataphaea is a moth of the family Crambidae. It is endemic to the Hawaiian island of Maui.
