= Udea montanalis =

Scientific classification
- Domain: Eukaryota
- Kingdom: Animalia
- Phylum: Arthropoda
- Class: Insecta
- Order: Lepidoptera
- Family: Crambidae
- Genus: Udea
- Species: U. montanalis

Binomial name
- Udea montanalis (Schaus, 1912)

Synonyms
- Pionea montanalis Schaus, 1912

Species of moth

Udea montanalis is a moth in the family Crambidae. It was described by Schaus in 1912. It is found in Costa Rica.

The wingspan is about 21 mm. The forewings are brown, with darker irrorations and a round whitish dark-edged spot in the middle of the cell and a curved whitish line on the discocellular, more broadly edged with dark brown. There is a small black postmedial spot on the costa. The hindwings are white with a brownish line terminal, somewhat interrupted by the veins.
