= Udea ichinosawana =

Scientific classification
- Kingdom: Animalia
- Phylum: Arthropoda
- Clade: Pancrustacea
- Class: Insecta
- Order: Lepidoptera
- Family: Crambidae
- Genus: Udea
- Species: U. ichinosawana

Binomial name
- Udea ichinosawana (Matsumura, 1925)

Synonyms
- Scoparia ichinosawana Matsumura, 1925

Species of moth

Udea ichinosawana is a moth in the family Crambidae. It was described by Shōnen Matsumura in 1925. It is found in the Russian Far East (Sakhalin).
