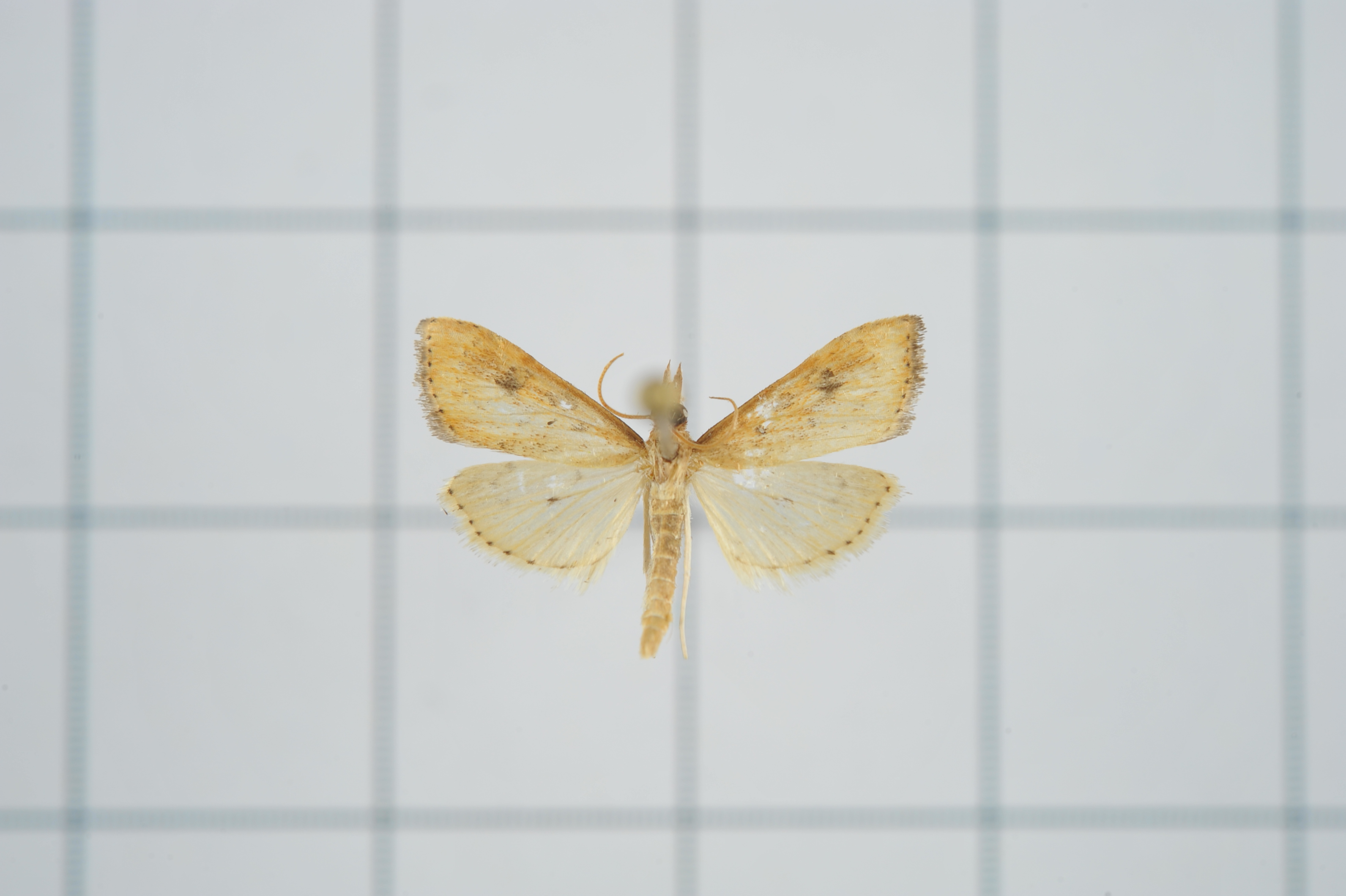

Scientific classification
- Domain: Eukaryota
- Kingdom: Animalia
- Phylum: Arthropoda
- Class: Insecta
- Order: Lepidoptera
- Family: Crambidae
- Genus: Udea
- Species: U. testacea

Binomial name
- Udea testacea (Butler, 1879)

Synonyms
- Scopula testacea Butler, 1879

= Udea testacea =

Species of moth

Udea testacea is a moth in the family Crambidae. It was described by Arthur Gardiner Butler in 1879. It is found in Japan, Taiwan and the Philippines.

The wingspan is 16–19 mm.
