= Udea dryadopa =

Scientific classification
- Kingdom: Animalia
- Phylum: Arthropoda
- Class: Insecta
- Order: Lepidoptera
- Family: Crambidae
- Genus: Udea
- Species: U. dryadopa

Binomial name
- Udea dryadopa (Meyrick, 1899)

Synonyms
- Pyrausta dryadopa Meyrick, 1899; Oeobia dryadopa

Species of moth

Udea dryadopa is a moth of the family Crambidae. It is endemic to the Hawaiian islands of Kauai, Oahu and Maui.
