= Udea ragonotii =

Scientific classification
- Kingdom: Animalia
- Phylum: Arthropoda
- Class: Insecta
- Order: Lepidoptera
- Family: Crambidae
- Genus: Udea
- Species: U. ragonotii

Binomial name
- Udea ragonotii (Butler, 1883)

Synonyms
- Mella ragonotii Butler, 1883

Species of moth

Udea ragonotii is a moth in the family Crambidae. It was described by Arthur Gardiner Butler in 1883. It is found in Chile.

The wingspan is about 24 mm. The forewings are sericeous (silky) cream colour, irrorated (speckled) with brown and black scales. The veins are pale sandy brownish and there are two arched indistinct brown streaks towards the apex, the first oblique, the second parallel to the outer margin. There is a black spot just before the middle of the cell, and a second, rather larger, at the inferior angle of the cell. There is also a marginal series of minute black dots. The hindwings are silvery pale grey, with two slightly darker spots placed obliquely at the end of the cell. There is also a marginal series of minute black dots.
