= Udea nea =

Scientific classification
- Domain: Eukaryota
- Kingdom: Animalia
- Phylum: Arthropoda
- Class: Insecta
- Order: Lepidoptera
- Family: Crambidae
- Genus: Udea
- Species: U. nea

Binomial name
- Udea nea (Strand, 1918)

Synonyms
- Pionea nea Strand, 1918

Species of moth

Udea nea is a moth in the family Crambidae. It was described by Strand in 1918. It is found in Taiwan.
