= Udea autoclesalis =

Scientific classification
- Kingdom: Animalia
- Phylum: Arthropoda
- Class: Insecta
- Order: Lepidoptera
- Family: Crambidae
- Genus: Udea
- Species: U. autoclesalis

Binomial name
- Udea autoclesalis (Walker, 1859)

Synonyms
- Botys autoclesalis Walker, 1859

Species of moth

Udea autoclesalis is a moth in the family Crambidae. It was described by Francis Walker in 1859. It is found in Rio de Janeiro, Brazil.
