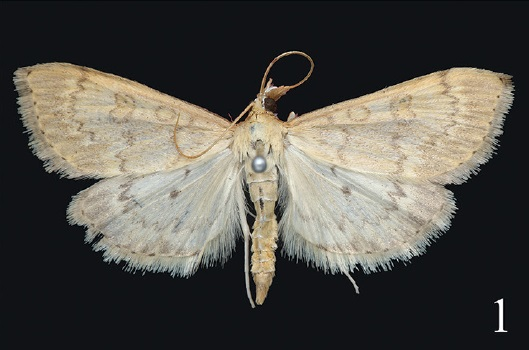

Scientific classification
- Domain: Eukaryota
- Kingdom: Animalia
- Phylum: Arthropoda
- Class: Insecta
- Order: Lepidoptera
- Family: Crambidae
- Genus: Udea
- Species: U. curvata

Binomial name
- Udea curvata Zhang & Li, 2016

= Udea curvata =

Species of moth

Udea curvata is a moth in the family Crambidae. It was first described by Zhang and Li in 2016. It is found in Tibet, China.

The wingspan is 25.5–28.5 mm. The forewings are yellow, scattered with brown scales, the markings grey brown. The antemedian line from the costal one-fourth is sinuated to one-third of the posterior margin. The proximal cellular stigma is circular and the distal cellular stigma is kidney shaped. The postmedian line is zigzaggy serrate, from the costal three-fourths, excurved around the cell, and strongly inflexed below the distal cellular stigma, then to two-thirds on the posterior margin. The postmedian area is strongly dusted with grey and alternately formed grey and yellow streaks. The vein ends on the wing margin each with a small brown dot. The fringe is yellow, the basal one-fourth grey. The hindwings are pale yellow, a darker steak at the anterior angle and a blackish dot at the posterior angle of the cell. The postmedial line is grey brown, zigzaggy serrate, with the anterior one-fourth most distinct. The postmedian area is similar to the forewing, the marginal line and fringe as the forewing, but paler at the tornus area.

== Etymology ==
The species name is derived from Latin curvata (meaning curved), referring to the curved fibula.
