= Udea cacuminicola =

Scientific classification
- Domain: Eukaryota
- Kingdom: Animalia
- Phylum: Arthropoda
- Class: Insecta
- Order: Lepidoptera
- Family: Crambidae
- Genus: Udea
- Species: U. cacuminicola

Binomial name
- Udea cacuminicola (Munroe, 1966)

Species of moth

Udea cacuminicola is a moth in the family Crambidae. It was described by Eugene G. Munroe in 1966. It is found in North America, where it has been recorded from Colorado and Wyoming.
