= Udea eucrena =

Scientific classification
- Kingdom: Animalia
- Phylum: Arthropoda
- Class: Insecta
- Order: Lepidoptera
- Family: Crambidae
- Genus: Udea
- Species: U. eucrena

Binomial name
- Udea eucrena (Meyrick, 1888)

Synonyms
- Scopula eucrena Meyrick, 1888; Oeobia eucrena; Phlyctaenia eucrena; Pionea leucozonea Hampson, 1913

Species of moth

Udea eucrena is a moth of the family Crambidae. It is endemic to the Hawaiian islands of Kauai, Oahu, Maui and Hawaii.

The color pattern varies in intensity and extent.

The larvae feed on Phyllostegia species.
