= Udea fumipennis =

Scientific classification
- Domain: Eukaryota
- Kingdom: Animalia
- Phylum: Arthropoda
- Class: Insecta
- Order: Lepidoptera
- Family: Crambidae
- Genus: Udea
- Species: U. fumipennis

Binomial name
- Udea fumipennis (Warren, 1892)

Synonyms
- Ebulea fumipennis Warren, 1892

Species of moth

Udea fumipennis is a moth in the family Crambidae. It was described by William Warren in 1892. It is found on the Galápagos Islands.

Adults are similar to Fumibotys fumalis, but smaller and the forewings are narrower, more vinous (wine) coloured and the direction of the first line is more oblique. It is however mainly distinguished by the hindwings, which are wholly suffused with dark fuscous hairy scales.
