= Udea nigrostigmalis =

Scientific classification
- Domain: Eukaryota
- Kingdom: Animalia
- Phylum: Arthropoda
- Class: Insecta
- Order: Lepidoptera
- Family: Crambidae
- Genus: Udea
- Species: U. nigrostigmalis

Binomial name
- Udea nigrostigmalis Warren, 1896

Synonyms
- Pionea nigrostigmalis

Species of moth

Udea nigrostigmalis is a moth in the family Crambidae. It was described by Warren in 1896. It is found in India (Khasia Hills).
