= Udea montensis =

Scientific classification
- Domain: Eukaryota
- Kingdom: Animalia
- Phylum: Arthropoda
- Class: Insecta
- Order: Lepidoptera
- Family: Crambidae
- Genus: Udea
- Species: U. montensis

Binomial name
- Udea montensis Mutuura, 1954

Species of moth

Udea montensis is a moth in the family Crambidae. It was described by Akira Mutuura in 1954. It is found in Honshu, Japan.
