= Udea diopsalis =

Scientific classification
- Kingdom: Animalia
- Phylum: Arthropoda
- Class: Insecta
- Order: Lepidoptera
- Family: Crambidae
- Genus: Udea
- Species: U. diopsalis

Binomial name
- Udea diopsalis (Hampson, 1913)

Synonyms
- Pionea diopsalis Hampson, 1913; Pionea diopsalis ab. nigerrimaculata Strand, 1917

Species of moth

Udea diopsalis is a moth in the family Crambidae. It was described by George Hampson in 1913. It is found in Chile.

The wingspan is about 24 mm. The forewings are pale rufous, the inner area whitish and irrorated with a few black scales. The antemedial line is absent and the orbicular and reniform are grey defined by fuscous, the former round, the latter irregularly quadrate. The terminal half of the costa has a series of small dark spots and the postmedial line consists of a series of black points and traces of a minutely dentate line between them, slightly excurved from the costa to vein 4, then oblique. There is a terminal series of prominent black points. The hindwings are white, the terminal area tinged with brown. There is a fine sinuous postmedial line from the costa to vein 3 and a terminal series of black points.
