= Udea simplicella =

Scientific classification
- Kingdom: Animalia
- Phylum: Arthropoda
- Clade: Pancrustacea
- Class: Insecta
- Order: Lepidoptera
- Family: Crambidae
- Genus: Udea
- Species: U. simplicella

Binomial name
- Udea simplicella (La Harpe, 1861)

Synonyms
- Eudorea simplicella La Harpe, 1861; Pionea thalalis D. Lucas, 1908

Species of moth

Udea simplicella is a species of moth in the family Crambidae. It was first described in 1861 by the French entomologist Jean Jacques Charles de La Harpe, originally under the name Eudorea simplicella.

The species is currently classified in the genus Udea and is placed within the moth family Crambidae, commonly known as grass moths. It has been recorded from the Mediterranean region, including Sicily, southern Italy, and parts of North Africa such as Tunisia and Morocco.
