= Udea binoculalis =

Scientific classification
- Kingdom: Animalia
- Phylum: Arthropoda
- Class: Insecta
- Order: Lepidoptera
- Family: Crambidae
- Genus: Udea
- Species: U. binoculalis

Binomial name
- Udea binoculalis (Hampson, 1904)

Synonyms
- Nacoleia binoculalis Hampson, 1904

Species of moth

Udea binoculalis is a moth in the family Crambidae. It was described by George Hampson in 1904. It is found on the Bahamas.

The wingspan is about 22 mm (0.87 in). The forewings are pale grey brown, thickly irrorated (sprinkled) with fuscous, the costal and terminal areas rather darker. There are traces of a waved subbasal line and an indistinct, oblique, waved antemedial line, as well as a small fuscous ocellus in the middle of the cell and a reniform discoidal spot. The postmedial line is slightly angled inwards at the discal fold, at vein 2 retracted to the lower angle of the cell, then excurved again. There is a terminal series of fuscous points. The hindwings are semihyaline white, the apical area tinged with brown. There is a discoidal stigma and a fine postmedial line angled inwards at the discal fold and obsolete on the inner half. There is also a terminal punctiform line.
