= Udea heterodoxa =

Scientific classification
- Kingdom: Animalia
- Phylum: Arthropoda
- Class: Insecta
- Order: Lepidoptera
- Family: Crambidae
- Genus: Udea
- Species: U. heterodoxa

Binomial name
- Udea heterodoxa (Meyrick, 1899)

Synonyms
- Phlyctaenia heterodoxa Meyrick, 1899; Oeobia heterodoxa

Species of moth

Udea heterodoxa is a moth of the family Crambidae and the order Lepidoptera.

It is endemic to the Hawaiian island of Maui.
