= Udea melanephra =

Scientific classification
- Kingdom: Animalia
- Phylum: Arthropoda
- Clade: Pancrustacea
- Class: Insecta
- Order: Lepidoptera
- Family: Crambidae
- Genus: Udea
- Species: U. melanephra

Binomial name
- Udea melanephra (Hampson, 1913)

Synonyms
- Pionea melanephra Hampson, 1913

Species of moth

Udea melanephra is a moth in the family Crambidae. It was described by George Hampson in 1913. It is found in Colombia and Bolivia.

The wingspan is about 24 mm. The forewings are ochreous, irrorated with a few blackish scales and with an indistinct sinuous dark antemedial line. There is a faint brown annulus in the middle of the cell and a prominent black discoidal lunule with a slight brown striga in the centre. There is a black point above it on the costa. The postmedial line has a black spot at the costa and there is a series of black points on it, incurved and with small black spot at the discal fold, below vein 4 bent inwards to below the end of the cell, then again excurved.

The terminal area is suffused with rufous with a series of black points on the costa towards the apex and on the termen. The hindwings are creamy white, the terminal area tinged with rufous from the costa to vein 2 and there is a small black spot at the upper angle of the cell and a point at the lower angle. There is a terminal series of points from the apex to vein 2.
