= Udea minnehaha =

Scientific classification
- Domain: Eukaryota
- Kingdom: Animalia
- Phylum: Arthropoda
- Class: Insecta
- Order: Lepidoptera
- Family: Crambidae
- Genus: Udea
- Species: U. minnehaha

Binomial name
- Udea minnehaha (Pryer, 1877)

Synonyms
- Pyrausta minnehaha Pryer, 1877; Paliga minnehaha

Species of moth

Udea minnehaha is a moth in the family Crambidae. It was described by Pryer in 1877. It is found in China (Zhejiang), Japan and Korea.
