= Udea liopis =

Scientific classification
- Kingdom: Animalia
- Phylum: Arthropoda
- Class: Insecta
- Order: Lepidoptera
- Family: Crambidae
- Genus: Udea
- Species: U. liopis

Binomial name
- Udea liopis (Meyrick, 1899)

Synonyms
- Oeobia liopis; Phlyctaenia liopis Meyrick, 1899; Oeobia rhodias; Phlyctaenia rhodias Meyrick, 1899

Species of moth

Udea liopis is a moth of the family Crambidae. It is endemic to the Hawaiian islands of Maui, Hawaii, Kauai, Oahu, Molokai and Lanai.

== Subspecies ==
- Udea liopis liopis (Maui, Hawaii)
- Udea liopis rhodias Meyrick, 1899 (Kauai, Oahu, Molokai, Lanai)
