= Udea bryochloris =

Scientific classification
- Kingdom: Animalia
- Phylum: Arthropoda
- Class: Insecta
- Order: Lepidoptera
- Family: Crambidae
- Genus: Udea
- Species: U. bryochloris

Binomial name
- Udea bryochloris (Meyrick, 1899)

Synonyms
- Pyrausta bryochloris Meyrick, 1899; Oeobia bryochloris; Notophytis bryochloris

Species of moth

Udea bryochloris is a moth of the family Crambidae, endemic to the Hawaiian island of Maui.

Adults are black and green.
