= Udea ferrealis =

Scientific classification
- Kingdom: Animalia
- Phylum: Arthropoda
- Class: Insecta
- Order: Lepidoptera
- Family: Crambidae
- Genus: Udea
- Species: U. ferrealis

Binomial name
- Udea ferrealis (Hampson, 1900)

Synonyms
- Pionea ferrealis Hampson, 1900

Species of moth

Udea ferrealis is a moth in the family Crambidae. It was described by George Hampson in 1900. It is found in Amur in the Russian Far East.

The wingspan is about 32 mm. The forewings are rufous with a fine antemedial line which is very oblique from the costa to the median nervure, then very sinuous. There is an elliptical darker rufous spot in the middle of the cell and a discoidal spot. There is also a minutely dentate postmedial line, curved from the costa to vein 3 and then oblique, as well as a terminal band with a dentate inner edge. The hindwings are whitish, suffused with pale brown, especially on the inner and terminal areas. There is also a dark point at the lower angle of the cell and a curved minutely dentate postmedial line.
