= Udea pyraustiformis =

Scientific classification
- Kingdom: Animalia
- Phylum: Arthropoda
- Class: Insecta
- Order: Lepidoptera
- Family: Crambidae
- Genus: Udea
- Species: U. pyraustiformis

Binomial name
- Udea pyraustiformis (Toll, 1948)

Synonyms
- Pionea pyraustiformis Toll, 1948

Species of moth

Udea pyraustiformis is a moth in the family Crambidae. It was described by Sergiusz Graf von Toll in 1948. It is found in Iran.
