= Udea berberalis =

Scientific classification
- Domain: Eukaryota
- Kingdom: Animalia
- Phylum: Arthropoda
- Class: Insecta
- Order: Lepidoptera
- Family: Crambidae
- Genus: Udea
- Species: U. berberalis

Binomial name
- Udea berberalis (Barnes & McDunnough, 1918)

Synonyms
- Phlyctaenia berberalis Barnes & McDunnough, 1918

Species of moth

Udea berberalis is a moth in the family Crambidae. It was described by William Barnes and James Halliday McDunnough in 1918. It is found in North America, where it has been recorded from California.

The wingspan is 18–22 mm. The forewings are pale ocherous, sparsely dusted with fuscous and fairly distinct maculation. There is a single, black line with the prominent tooth in the cell and a slight inward bend in the submedian fold. The orbicular is a small round spot filled with the pale ground color and the reniform (kidney-shaped) is medium-sized, lunate and pale centered. There are four or five-minute dark costal spots between the reniform and the apex. There is a second single, dentate line with a large inward loop below the cell to the base of vein 2, as well as a terminal dotted line. The hindwings are pale and smoky with traces of a discal dot and a bent postmedian line, as well as a distinct terminal dotted line.
