= Udea exigualis =

Scientific classification
- Domain: Eukaryota
- Kingdom: Animalia
- Phylum: Arthropoda
- Class: Insecta
- Order: Lepidoptera
- Family: Crambidae
- Genus: Udea
- Species: U. exigualis

Binomial name
- Udea exigualis (Wileman, 1911)

Synonyms
- Pionea exigualis Wileman, 1911

Species of moth

Udea exigualis is a moth in the family Crambidae. It was described by Alfred Ernest Wileman in 1911. It is found in Japan, China (Fujian, Guangxi, Guizhou, Hubei, Hunan, Sichuan, Tibet, Yunnan) and Pakistan.

The wingspan is 16–21 mm.
