= Udea planalis =

Scientific classification
- Domain: Eukaryota
- Kingdom: Animalia
- Phylum: Arthropoda
- Class: Insecta
- Order: Lepidoptera
- Family: Crambidae
- Genus: Udea
- Species: U. planalis

Binomial name
- Udea planalis (South in Leech & South, 1901)

Synonyms
- Pionea planalis South in Leech & South, 1901

Species of moth

Udea planalis is a moth in the family Crambidae. It was described by South in 1901. It is found in western China.
