= Udea endotrichialis =

Scientific classification
- Kingdom: Animalia
- Phylum: Arthropoda
- Class: Insecta
- Order: Lepidoptera
- Family: Crambidae
- Genus: Udea
- Species: U. endotrichialis

Binomial name
- Udea endotrichialis (Hampson, 1918)

Synonyms
- Hapalia endotrichialis Hampson, 1918

Species of moth

Udea endotrichialis is a moth in the family Crambidae. It was described by George Hampson in 1918. It is found in Taiwan.

The wingspan is about 28 mm. The forewings are orange-yellow, with a faint brownish antemedial line, oblique to median the nervure, then erect. There are minute reddish brown spots in the cell towards the extremity and on the discocellulars. The postmedial line is reddish brown, excurved and slightly waved to below vein 3, then retracted to below the end of the cell and waved to the inner margin. There is a fine dark brown terminal line. The hindwings are orange-yellow with a brown postmedial line, arising at vein 6, oblique to vein 2, then slightly incurved and ending at the submedian fold. There is also a fine dark brown terminal line except towards the tornus.
