= Udea proximalis =

Scientific classification
- Kingdom: Animalia
- Phylum: Arthropoda
- Class: Insecta
- Order: Lepidoptera
- Family: Crambidae
- Genus: Udea
- Species: U. proximalis

Binomial name
- Udea proximalis Inoue, Yamanaka & Sasaki, 2008

Species of moth

Udea proximalis is a moth in the family Crambidae. It was described by Hiroshi Inoue, Hiroshi Yamanaka and Akio Sasaki in 2008. It is found on Hokkaido island in Japan.
