= Udea auratalis =

Scientific classification
- Domain: Eukaryota
- Kingdom: Animalia
- Phylum: Arthropoda
- Class: Insecta
- Order: Lepidoptera
- Family: Crambidae
- Genus: Udea
- Species: U. auratalis

Binomial name
- Udea auratalis (Warren, 1895)

Synonyms
- Leucocraspeda auratalis Warren, 1895; Pionea auratalis ab. obscura Caradja in Caradja & Meyrick, 1935

Species of insect

Udea auratalis is a moth in the family Crambidae. It was described by Warren in 1895. It is found in Japan and China.
