= Udea brevipalpis =

Scientific classification
- Domain: Eukaryota
- Kingdom: Animalia
- Phylum: Arthropoda
- Class: Insecta
- Order: Lepidoptera
- Family: Crambidae
- Genus: Udea
- Species: U. brevipalpis

Binomial name
- Udea brevipalpis Munroe, 1966

Species of moth

Udea brevipalpis is a moth in the family Crambidae. It was described by Eugene G. Munroe in 1966. It is found in North America, where it has been recorded from California, Colorado and Utah.

The wingspan is about 21 mm. Adults have been recorded on wing from July to August.
