= Udea tachdirtalis =

Scientific classification
- Domain: Eukaryota
- Kingdom: Animalia
- Phylum: Arthropoda
- Class: Insecta
- Order: Lepidoptera
- Family: Crambidae
- Genus: Udea
- Species: U. tachdirtalis

Binomial name
- Udea tachdirtalis (Zerny, 1935)

Synonyms
- Pyrausta tachdirtalis Zerny, 1935

Species of moth

Udea tachdirtalis is a moth in the family Crambidae. It was described by Zerny in 1935. It is found in Morocco.
