= Udea pachygramma =

Scientific classification
- Kingdom: Animalia
- Phylum: Arthropoda
- Class: Insecta
- Order: Lepidoptera
- Family: Crambidae
- Genus: Udea
- Species: U. pachygramma

Binomial name
- Udea pachygramma (Meyrick, 1899)

Synonyms
- Phlyctaenia pachygramma Meyrick, 1899; Oeobia pachygramma

Species of moth

Udea pachygramma is a moth of the family Crambidae. It is endemic to the Hawaiian islands of Oahu and Hawaii.
