= Udea maderensis =

Scientific classification
- Domain: Eukaryota
- Kingdom: Animalia
- Phylum: Arthropoda
- Class: Insecta
- Order: Lepidoptera
- Family: Crambidae
- Genus: Udea
- Species: U. maderensis

Binomial name
- Udea maderensis (Bethune-Baker, 1894)

Synonyms
- Botys maderensis Bethune-Baker, 1894

Species of moth

Udea maderensis is a species of moth in the family Crambidae. It is found on Madeira.
