= Udea radiosalis =

Scientific classification
- Domain: Eukaryota
- Kingdom: Animalia
- Phylum: Arthropoda
- Class: Insecta
- Order: Lepidoptera
- Family: Crambidae
- Genus: Udea
- Species: U. radiosalis

Binomial name
- Udea radiosalis (Möschler, 1883)

Synonyms
- Botys radiosalis Möschler, 1883; Pionea radiosalis Rebel, 1901

Species of moth

Udea radiosalis is a species of moth in the family Crambidae. It was first described by Heinrich Benno Möschler in 1883. It is found in North America, where it has been recorded from Alberta, Arizona, California, Montana, Nevada, Newfoundland and Labrador and Utah.

The wingspan is about 21 mm. Adults have been recorded on wing from July to September.
