= Udea ochreocapitalis =

Scientific classification
- Domain: Eukaryota
- Kingdom: Animalia
- Phylum: Arthropoda
- Class: Insecta
- Order: Lepidoptera
- Family: Crambidae
- Genus: Udea
- Species: U. ochreocapitalis

Binomial name
- Udea ochreocapitalis (Ragonot, 1894)

Synonyms
- Botys ochreocapitalis Ragonot, 1894

Species of moth

Udea ochreocapitalis is a moth in the family Crambidae. It was described by Ragonot in 1894. It is found in the Russian Far East (Amur).
