= Udea nordmani =

Scientific classification
- Domain: Eukaryota
- Kingdom: Animalia
- Phylum: Arthropoda
- Class: Insecta
- Order: Lepidoptera
- Family: Crambidae
- Genus: Udea
- Species: U. nordmani

Binomial name
- Udea nordmani (Rebel, 1935)

Synonyms
- Pionea nordmani Rebel, 1935; Udea nordmani

Species of moth

Udea nordmani is a species of moth in the family Crambidae. It is found on the Canary Islands.
