= Udea bourgognealis =

Scientific classification
- Domain: Eukaryota
- Kingdom: Animalia
- Phylum: Arthropoda
- Class: Insecta
- Order: Lepidoptera
- Family: Crambidae
- Genus: Udea
- Species: U. bourgognealis

Binomial name
- Udea bourgognealis Leraut, 1996

Species of moth

Udea bourgognealis is a species of moth in the family Crambidae. It is found in France, where it has been recorded from the Alpes-Maritimes.
