= Udea mandronalis =

Scientific classification
- Kingdom: Animalia
- Phylum: Arthropoda
- Class: Insecta
- Order: Lepidoptera
- Family: Crambidae
- Genus: Udea
- Species: U. mandronalis

Binomial name
- Udea mandronalis (Walker, 1859)

Synonyms
- Scopula mandronalis Walker, 1859; Paliga mandronalis

Species of moth

Udea mandronalis is a moth in the family Crambidae. It is found in Sri Lanka.

Adults are dull ochraceous with a marginal pale line on the wings. The interior and exterior lines and reniform mark on the forewings are cinereous, diffuse and indistinct. The hindwings are whitish, with a broad cinereous border.
