= Udea thermantoidis =

Scientific classification
- Domain: Eukaryota
- Kingdom: Animalia
- Phylum: Arthropoda
- Class: Insecta
- Order: Lepidoptera
- Family: Crambidae
- Genus: Udea
- Species: U. thermantoidis

Binomial name
- Udea thermantoidis (Swezey, 1913)

Synonyms
- Pyrausta thermantoidis Swezey, 1913; Udea thermantoides; Oeobia thermantoides

Species of moth

Udea thermantoidis is a moth of the family Crambidae. It is endemic to the island of Hawaii.
