= Udea thyalis =

Scientific classification
- Kingdom: Animalia
- Phylum: Arthropoda
- Class: Insecta
- Order: Lepidoptera
- Family: Crambidae
- Genus: Udea
- Species: U. thyalis

Binomial name
- Udea thyalis (Walker, 1859)

Synonyms
- Botys thyalis Walker, 1859

Species of moth

Udea thyalis is a moth in the family Crambidae. It was described by Francis Walker in 1859. It is found in China.
