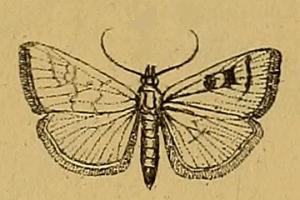

Scientific classification
- Domain: Eukaryota
- Kingdom: Animalia
- Phylum: Arthropoda
- Class: Insecta
- Order: Lepidoptera
- Family: Crambidae
- Genus: Udea
- Species: U. confinalis

Binomial name
- Udea confinalis (Lederer, 1858)

Synonyms
- Botys confinalis Lederer, 1858; Udea institalis var. graecalis Staudinger, 1870

= Udea confinalis =

Species of moth

Udea confinalis is a species of moth in the family Crambidae. It is found in Greece and Syria.
