= Udea endopyra =

Scientific classification
- Kingdom: Animalia
- Phylum: Arthropoda
- Class: Insecta
- Order: Lepidoptera
- Family: Crambidae
- Genus: Udea
- Species: U. endopyra

Binomial name
- Udea endopyra (Meyrick, 1899)

Synonyms
- Phlyctaenia endopyra Meyrick, 1899; Oeobia endopyra

Species of moth

Udea endopyra is a moth of the family Crambidae. It is endemic to the Hawaiian islands of Oahu, Molokai, Maui and Hawaii.

The larvae feed on Rubus hawaiiensis. They roll the leaves of their host plant.
