= Udea exalbalis =

Scientific classification
- Domain: Eukaryota
- Kingdom: Animalia
- Phylum: Arthropoda
- Class: Insecta
- Order: Lepidoptera
- Family: Crambidae
- Genus: Udea
- Species: U. exalbalis

Binomial name
- Udea exalbalis (Caradja, 1916)

Synonyms
- Pionea elutalis var. exalbalis Caradja, 1916; Udea sviridovi Bolshakov, 2002

Species of moth

Udea exalbalis is a species of moth in the family Crambidae. It is found in Kazakhstan and Russia, where it has been recorded from the Tula region.

The wingspan is 22–27 millimetres (0.87–1.06 in). Adults have been recorded from May to June.
