= Udea mechedalis =

Scientific classification
- Kingdom: Animalia
- Phylum: Arthropoda
- Class: Insecta
- Order: Lepidoptera
- Family: Crambidae
- Genus: Udea
- Species: U. mechedalis

Binomial name
- Udea mechedalis (Amsel, 1950)

Synonyms
- Pyrausta mechedalis Amsel, 1950

Species of moth

Udea mechedalis is a moth in the family Crambidae. It was described by Hans Georg Amsel in 1950 and is found in Iran.
