= Udea argoscelis =

Scientific classification
- Kingdom: Animalia
- Phylum: Arthropoda
- Class: Insecta
- Order: Lepidoptera
- Family: Crambidae
- Genus: Udea
- Species: U. argoscelis

Binomial name
- Udea argoscelis (Meyrick, 1888)

Synonyms
- Scopula argoscelis Meyrick, 1888; Oeobia argoscelis; Phlyctaenia argoscelis

Species of moth

Udea argoscelis is a moth of the family Crambidae. It is endemic to the Hawaiian islands of Kauai, Oahu, Molokai and Hawaii.

The larvae feed on Rumex giganteus.
