= Udea vacunalis =

Scientific classification
- Kingdom: Animalia
- Phylum: Arthropoda
- Class: Insecta
- Order: Lepidoptera
- Family: Crambidae
- Genus: Udea
- Species: U. vacunalis

Binomial name
- Udea vacunalis (Grote, 1881)

Synonyms
- Botis vacunalis Grote, 1881; Pyrausta galactalis Dyar, 1925

Species of moth

Udea vacunalis is a moth in the family Crambidae. It was described by Augustus Radcliffe Grote in 1881. It is found in North America, where it has been recorded from California.

The wingspan is about 24 mm. The forewings are pale yellowish white without markings. The hindwings are pure white, immaculate, with a dotted exterior black line, only partially continued. There is a terminal row of dots at the base of the white fringes. Adults are on wing from July to August.
