= Udea melanostictalis =

Scientific classification
- Kingdom: Animalia
- Phylum: Arthropoda
- Class: Insecta
- Order: Lepidoptera
- Family: Crambidae
- Genus: Udea
- Species: U. melanostictalis

Binomial name
- Udea melanostictalis (Hampson in Poulton, 1916)

Synonyms
- Pionea melanostictalis Hampson in Poulton, 1916

Species of moth

Udea melanostictalis is a moth in the family Crambidae. It was described by George Hampson in 1916. It is found in Kenya.

The wingspan is about 16 mm. The forewings are whitish, tinged and irrorated (sprinkled) with brown. The costal area is browner and there are small antemedial black spots on the subcostal and median nervures, vein 1 and above the inner margin, as well as a black point in the cell towards the extremity and discoidal bar. The postmedial line is black, dentate to vein 4, then with an oblique bar to vein 2, then retracted to below the end of the cell and excurved at the submedian fold and slightly above the inner margin. There is also a curved series of blackish points just before the termen and a terminal series. The hindwings are whitish suffused with red brown and with traces of a curved brown postmedial line. There is also a terminal series of slight brown points.
