= Udea flavofimbriata =

Scientific classification
- Domain: Eukaryota
- Kingdom: Animalia
- Phylum: Arthropoda
- Class: Insecta
- Order: Lepidoptera
- Family: Crambidae
- Genus: Udea
- Species: U. flavofimbriata

Binomial name
- Udea flavofimbriata (Moore, 1888)

Synonyms
- Mabra flavofimbriata Moore, 1888; Botys obealis Snellen, 1899

Species of moth

Udea flavofimbriata is a moth in the family Crambidae. It was described by Frederic Moore in 1888. It is found in India, Sri Lanka and Indonesia (Sumatra, Java).
