= Udea ialis =

Scientific classification
- Kingdom: Animalia
- Phylum: Arthropoda
- Class: Insecta
- Order: Lepidoptera
- Family: Crambidae
- Genus: Udea
- Species: U. ialis

Binomial name
- Udea ialis (Walker, 1859)

Synonyms
- Ebulea ialis Walker, 1859

Species of insect

Udea ialis is a moth in the family Crambidae. It was described by Francis Walker in 1859. It is found in Brazil and Bolivia.

Adults are pale cinereous (ash-gray) fawn, the forewings are slightly and minutely speckled with black, with a large purplish-blackish patch which occupies the exterior border with the exception of the tip, and contains some pale marginal points. There are three costal subapical points and the orbicular and reniform marks form two incomplete black ringlets. The hindwings are white, semihyaline and iridescent, with a brown border, which does not extend to the interior angle.
