= Udea cinerea =

Scientific classification
- Kingdom: Animalia
- Phylum: Arthropoda
- Class: Insecta
- Order: Lepidoptera
- Family: Crambidae
- Genus: Udea
- Species: U. cinerea

Binomial name
- Udea cinerea (Butler, 1883)

Synonyms
- Scopula cinerea Butler, 1883

Species of moth

Udea cinerea is a moth in the family Crambidae. It was described by Arthur Gardiner Butler in 1883. It is found in Chile.

The wingspan is about 23 mm. Adults are similar to Udea inquinatalis, from which they differ in the larger and blacker costal spots on the forewings.
