= Udea chytropa =

Scientific classification
- Kingdom: Animalia
- Phylum: Arthropoda
- Class: Insecta
- Order: Lepidoptera
- Family: Crambidae
- Genus: Udea
- Species: U. chytropa

Binomial name
- Udea chytropa (Meyrick, 1899)

Synonyms
- Phlyctaenia chytropa Meyrick, 1899; Oeobia chytropa

Species of moth

Udea chytropa is a moth of the family Crambidae. It is endemic to the Hawaiian islands of Kauai and Oahu.

The larvae feed on native Hibiscus species. They feed between webbed leaves of the host plant.
