= Udea ochropera =

Scientific classification
- Kingdom: Animalia
- Phylum: Arthropoda
- Class: Insecta
- Order: Lepidoptera
- Family: Crambidae
- Genus: Udea
- Species: U. ochropera

Binomial name
- Udea ochropera (Hampson, 1913)

Synonyms
- Pionea ochropera Hampson, 1913

Species of moth

Udea ochropera is a moth in the family Crambidae. It was described by George Hampson in 1913. It is found in Colombia and Mexico.

The wingspan is about 26 mm. The forewings are ochreous, irrorated with dark brown and suffused with purplish fuscous except on the costal area and the inner margin. The apical area is ochreous, with a dark streak below vein 8 and the antemedial line is blackish, angled outwards below the costa and bent outwards to the inner margin. There is a black annulus in the middle of the cell and a narrow elliptical discoidal annulus defined by black. The postmedial line is blackish, slightly defined on the outer side by ochreous, obliquely downcurved to vein 6, excurved and slightly waved to vein 2, then bent inwards to below the end of the cell and again excurved. There are some small black spots on the costa towards the apex, as well as a blackish terminal line with ochreous points at the veins. The hindwings are semihyaline white with black points at the angles of the cell. The apical area and the termen to vein 2 are suffused with brown, the termen with blackish points to the submedian fold.
