= Udea paghmanalis =

Scientific classification
- Domain: Eukaryota
- Kingdom: Animalia
- Phylum: Arthropoda
- Class: Insecta
- Order: Lepidoptera
- Family: Crambidae
- Genus: Udea
- Species: U. paghmanalis

Binomial name
- Udea paghmanalis (Amsel, 1970)

Synonyms
- Oeobia paghmanalis Amsel, 1970

Species of moth

Udea paghmanalis is a moth in the family Crambidae. It was described by Hans Georg Amsel in 1970 and is found in Afghanistan.
