= Udea detersalis =

Scientific classification
- Kingdom: Animalia
- Phylum: Arthropoda
- Class: Insecta
- Order: Lepidoptera
- Family: Crambidae
- Genus: Udea
- Species: U. detersalis

Binomial name
- Udea detersalis (Walker, 1866)

Synonyms
- Scopula detersalis Walker, 1866

Species of moth

Udea detersalis is a moth in the family Crambidae. It was described by Francis Walker in 1866. It is found in Venezuela.
