= Udea hageni =

Scientific classification
- Kingdom: Animalia
- Phylum: Arthropoda
- Class: Insecta
- Order: Lepidoptera
- Family: Crambidae
- Genus: Udea
- Species: U. hageni

Binomial name
- Udea hageni Viette, 1952

Species of moth

Udea hageni is a moth in the family Crambidae. It was described by Viette in 1952. It is endemic to the Mid-Atlantic Ridge island of Tristan da Cunha.
