= Udea praepetalis =

Scientific classification
- Domain: Eukaryota
- Kingdom: Animalia
- Phylum: Arthropoda
- Class: Insecta
- Order: Lepidoptera
- Family: Crambidae
- Genus: Udea
- Species: U. praepetalis

Binomial name
- Udea praepetalis (Lederer, 1869)

Synonyms
- Botys praepetalis Lederer, 1869

Species of moth

Udea praepetalis is a moth in the family Crambidae. It was described by Julius Lederer in 1869. It is found in Iran and Turkey.
