= Udea ephippias =

Scientific classification
- Kingdom: Animalia
- Phylum: Arthropoda
- Class: Insecta
- Order: Lepidoptera
- Family: Crambidae
- Genus: Udea
- Species: U. ephippias

Binomial name
- Udea ephippias (Meyrick, 1899)

Synonyms
- Phlyctaenia ephippias Meyrick, 1899; Oeobia ephippias

Species of moth

Udea ephippias is a moth of the family Crambidae. It is endemic to the Hawaiian islands of Kauai, Oahu, Molokai and Maui.
