= Udea pyranthes =

Scientific classification
- Kingdom: Animalia
- Phylum: Arthropoda
- Class: Insecta
- Order: Lepidoptera
- Family: Crambidae
- Genus: Udea
- Species: U. pyranthes

Binomial name
- Udea pyranthes (Meyrick, 1899)

Synonyms
- Phlyctaenia pyranthes Meyrick, 1899; Oeobia pyranthes

Species of moth

Udea pyranthes is a moth of the family Crambidae. It is endemic to the Hawaiian islands of Kauai, Oahu, Molokai, Maui and Hawaii.

The larvae feed on Vactinium calycinum, Vactinium penduliflorum and Vactinium penduliflorum gemmaceum. The caterpillar has a pale brown head checkered with darker brown.
