= Udea octosignalis =

Scientific classification
- Kingdom: Animalia
- Phylum: Arthropoda
- Clade: Pancrustacea
- Class: Insecta
- Order: Lepidoptera
- Family: Crambidae
- Genus: Udea
- Species: U. octosignalis

Binomial name
- Udea octosignalis (Hulst, 1886)

Synonyms
- Botis octosignalis Hulst, 1886; Ebulea straminea Warren, 1892

Species of moth

Udea octosignalis is a moth in the family Crambidae. It was described by George Duryea Hulst in 1886. It is found in North America, where it has been recorded from California and Texas.

The wingspan is about 20 mm (0.8 in). The forewings are light ocherous, the costal area and markings buff. The basal line is rounded and the outer line is sinuous, both without dentations. There is faint subterminal fuscous shading and the marginal line is fine and buff. The hindwings are white, faintly ocherous outwardly and the marginal line is fine and brownish.
