= Udea nomophilodes =

Scientific classification
- Kingdom: Animalia
- Phylum: Arthropoda
- Class: Insecta
- Order: Lepidoptera
- Family: Crambidae
- Genus: Udea
- Species: U. nomophilodes

Binomial name
- Udea nomophilodes (Hampson, 1913)

Synonyms
- Pionea nomophilodes Hampson, 1913

Species of moth

Udea nomophilodes is a moth in the family Crambidae. It was described by George Hampson in 1913. It is found in Chile.

The wingspan is about 22 mm. The forewings are white tinged with pale red-brown, especially on the costal area. There is a minute black point in the middle of the cell and a discoidal point just above the lower angle of the cell, as well as a terminal series of minute black points. The hindwings are white, faintly tinged with red-brown and with a terminal series of minute black points.
