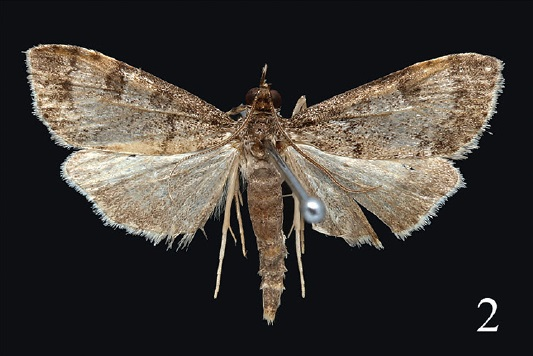

Scientific classification
- Domain: Eukaryota
- Kingdom: Animalia
- Phylum: Arthropoda
- Class: Insecta
- Order: Lepidoptera
- Family: Crambidae
- Genus: Udea
- Species: U. albostriata

Binomial name
- Udea albostriata Zhang & Li, 2016

= Udea albostriata =

Species of moth

Udea albostriata is a moth in the family Crambidae. It was first described by Zhang and Li in 2016. It is found in Hebei, China.

The wingspan is 17–23 mm. The forewing ground colour is greyish white, dusted with dark brown, the proximal and distal cellular stigmata and postmedian area strongly and contrastingly dark brown. The antemedian line from one-fifth of the costa oblique outwards to the posterior margin of the cell, then sinuating to one-third of the posterior margin. The proximal cellular stigma is transversely oval, dark brown, rimmed with blackish. The distal cellular stigma is nearly 8-shaped, coloured like the proximal cellular stigma. the postmedian line is sinuate, from costal the four-fifths slightly arched to three-fifths of CuA2, followed by a V-shaped curve, then to two-thirds of the posterior margin, traced by a greyish-white line in the postmedian area. There are marginal brown dots at the vein ends on the costa and termen. The basal half of the fringe is pale grey, the distal half dirty white. The hindwings are grey, the markings indistinct. There is a dark streak at the anterior angle and a blackish dot at the posterior angle of the cell. The postmedian line is very indistinct, parallel with the termen. The fringe is paler than in the forewing.

== Etymology ==
The species name is derived from Latin albus (white) and striatus (meaning lined), referring to forewing postmedian line traced by a greyish-white line in the postmedian area.
