= Udea illineatalis =

Scientific classification
- Domain: Eukaryota
- Kingdom: Animalia
- Phylum: Arthropoda
- Class: Insecta
- Order: Lepidoptera
- Family: Crambidae
- Genus: Udea
- Species: U. illineatalis

Binomial name
- Udea illineatalis (Dognin, 1904)

Synonyms
- Pionea illineatalis Dognin, 1904

Species of moth

Udea illineatalis is a moth in the family Crambidae. It was described by Paul Dognin in 1904. It is found in Ecuador.
