= Udea monticolens =

Scientific classification
- Domain: Eukaryota
- Kingdom: Animalia
- Phylum: Arthropoda
- Class: Insecta
- Order: Lepidoptera
- Family: Crambidae
- Genus: Udea
- Species: U. monticolens

Binomial name
- Udea monticolens (Butler, 1882)

Synonyms
- Locastra monticolens Butler, 1882; Oeobia monticolans; Scopula monticolans; Pionea monticolans; Phlyctaenia monticolans

Species of moth

Udea monticolens is a moth of the family Crambidae described by Arthur Gardiner Butler in 1882. It is endemic to the Hawaiian islands of Kauai, Oahu and Hawaii.

The larvae feed on Ipomoea bona-nox.
