= Udea saxifragae =

Scientific classification
- Domain: Eukaryota
- Kingdom: Animalia
- Phylum: Arthropoda
- Class: Insecta
- Order: Lepidoptera
- Family: Crambidae
- Genus: Udea
- Species: U. saxifragae

Binomial name
- Udea saxifragae (McDunnough, 1935)

Synonyms
- Phlyctaenia saxifragae McDunnough, 1935

Species of moth

Udea saxifragae is a moth in the family Crambidae. It was described by James Halliday McDunnough in 1935. It is found in North America, where it has been recorded from British Columbia.

The larvae feed on Saxifraga species.
