= Udea ennychioides =

Scientific classification
- Domain: Eukaryota
- Kingdom: Animalia
- Phylum: Arthropoda
- Class: Insecta
- Order: Lepidoptera
- Family: Crambidae
- Genus: Udea
- Species: U. ennychioides

Binomial name
- Udea ennychioides (Butler, 1881)

Synonyms
- Mecyna ennychioides Butler, 1881; Oeobia ennychioides; Melanomecyna ennychioides; Scopula ennychioides; Pionea ennychioides; Phlyctaenia ennychioides

Species of moth

Udea ennychioides is a moth of the family Crambidae and genus of Udea.

It is endemic to the Hawaiian islands of Kauai, Oahu and Maui.
