= Udea metasema =

Scientific classification
- Kingdom: Animalia
- Phylum: Arthropoda
- Class: Insecta
- Order: Lepidoptera
- Family: Crambidae
- Genus: Udea
- Species: U. metasema

Binomial name
- Udea metasema (Meyrick, 1899)

Synonyms
- Phlyctaenia metasema Meyrick, 1899; Oeobia metasema

Species of moth

Udea metasema is a moth of the family Crambidae. It is endemic to the Hawaiian islands of Maui and Hawaii.

The larvae feed on Phyllostegia glabra.
