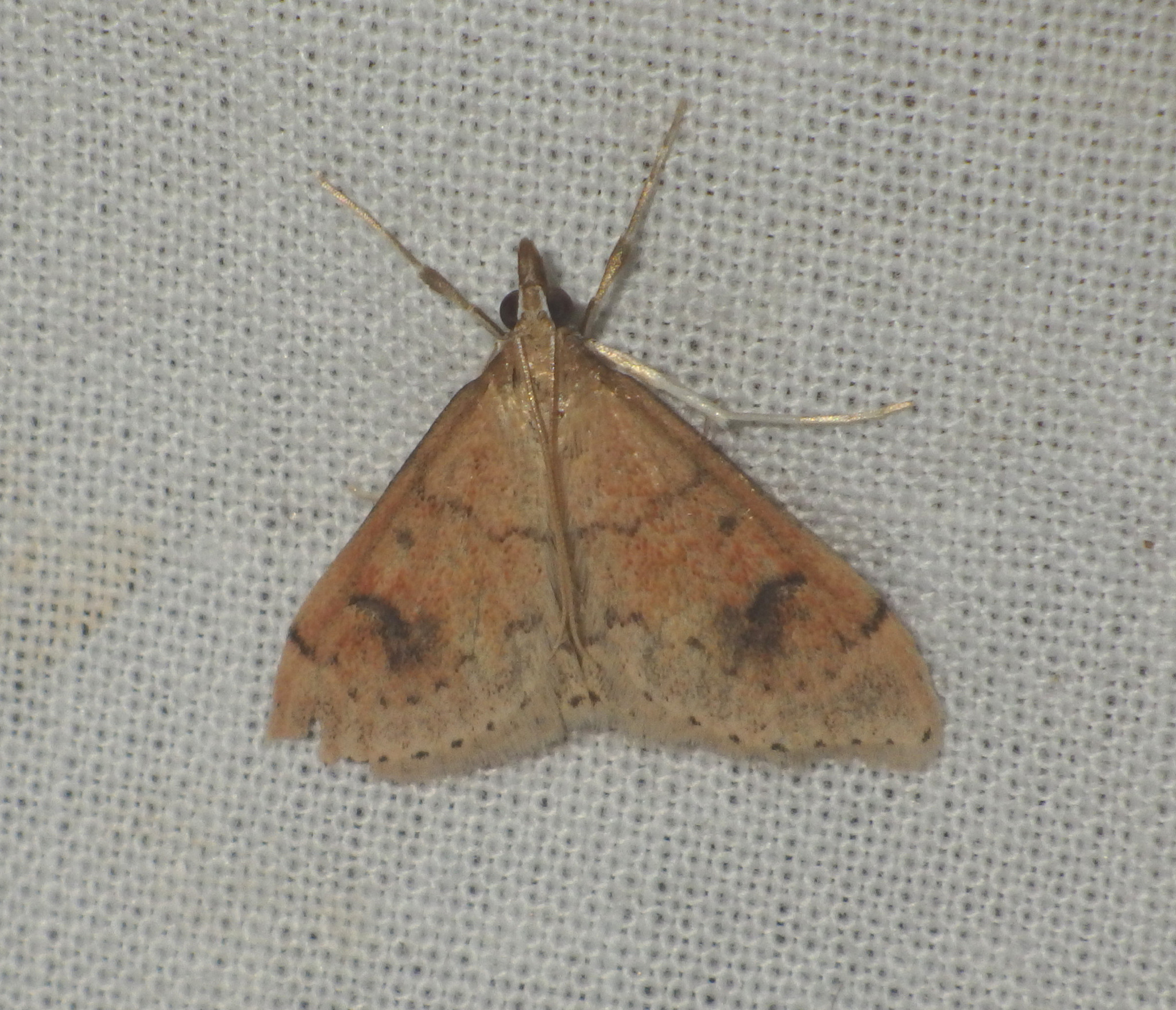

Scientific classification
- Kingdom: Animalia
- Phylum: Arthropoda
- Class: Insecta
- Order: Lepidoptera
- Family: Crambidae
- Genus: Pyrausta
- Species: P. pauperalis

Binomial name
- Pyrausta pauperalis (Staudinger, 1879)

Synonyms
- Botys pauperalis Staudinger, 1879

= Pyrausta pauperalis =

Species of moth

Pyrausta pauperalis is a species of moth in the family Crambidae. It was described by Otto Staudinger in 1879. It is found in Turkey.
