= List of Lepidoptera of Hawaii =

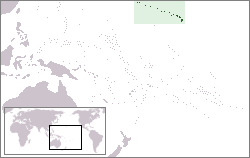
Location of Hawaii

An estimated 1,150 species of Lepidoptera, the order comprising butterflies and moths, have been recorded in the U.S. state of Hawaii. Of these, 948 are endemic and 199 are nonindigenous species.

This page provides a link to either individual species or genera. The latter is used when all species of the genus are endemic to Hawaii, the individual species can be found on the genus page.

== Butterflies ==
=== Papilionidae ===
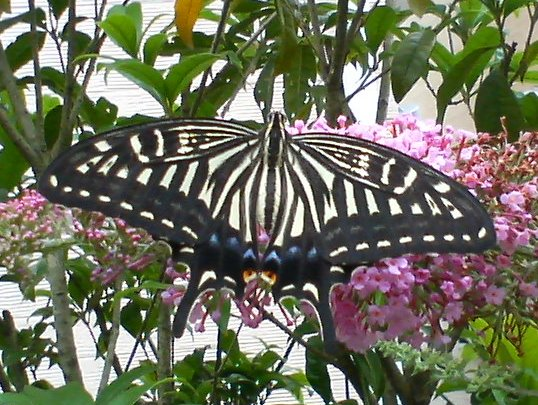
Papilio xuthus

- Papilio xuthus (Linnaeus, 1767)

=== Pieridae ===
- Colias ponteni Wallengren, 1860
- Abaeis nicippe (Cramer, 1779)
- Pieris rapae (Linnaeus, 1758)
- Phoebis agarithe (Boisduval, 1836)

=== Nymphalidae ===
- Agraulis vanillae (Linnaeus, 1758)
- Danaus plexippus (Linnaeus, 1758)
- Vanessa atalanta (Linnaeus, 1758)
- Vanessa cardui (Linnaeus, 1758)
- Vanessa tameamea (Eschscholtz, 1878)
- Vanessa virginiensis (Drury, 1773)

=== Lycaenidae ===
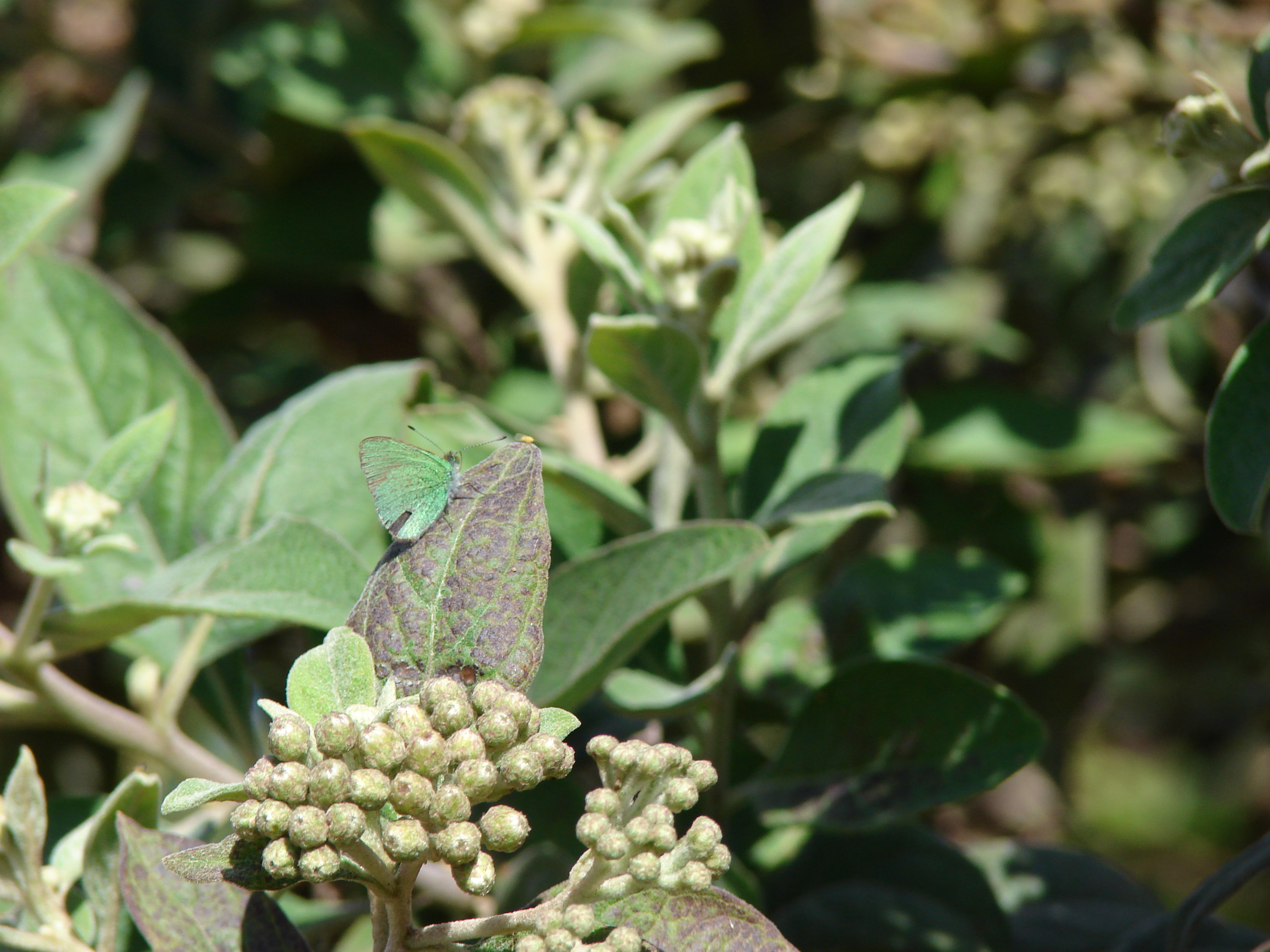
Udara blackburni, one of only two butterflies endemic to Hawaii

- Brephidium exilis Boisduval, 1852
- Lampides boeticus (Linnaeus, 1767)
- Strymon bazochii (Godart, [1824])
- Tmolus echion (Linnaeus, 1767)
- Zizina otis (Fabricius, 1787)
- Udara blackburni (Tuely, 1878)

=== Hesperiidae ===
- Hylephila phyleus (Drury, 1773)
- Erionota thrax (Linnaeus, 1767)

== Macro moths ==
=== Geometridae ===
- Chloroclystis pyrrholopha Turner, 1907
- Cyclophora nanaria (Walker, 1861)
- Disclisioprocta stellata (Guenée, [1858])
- Euacidalia brownsvillea Cassino, 1931
- Eupithecia craterias (Meyrick, 1899)
- Eupithecia dryinombra (Meyrick, 1899)
- Eupithecia monticolans Butler, 1881
- Eupithecia niphoreas (Meyrick, 1899)
- Eupithecia orichloris Meyrick, 1899
- Eupithecia phaeocausta (Meyrick 1899)
- Eupithecia prasinombra (Meyrick, 1899)
- Eupithecia rhodopyra (Meyrick, 1899)
- Eupithecia scoriodes (Meyrick, 1899)
- Eupithecia staurophragma (Meyrick, 1899)
- Eupithecia stypheliae (Swezey, 1948)
- Fletcherana
- Gymnoscelis rufifasciata Haworth, 1809
- Iridopsis fragilaria Grossbeck, 1909
- Kauaiina
- Psamatodes abydata Guenée, [1858]
- Megalotica
- Pleuroprucha asthenaria (Walker, 1861)
- Progonostola
- Scopula personata (Prout, 1913)
- Scotorythra
- Tritocleis

=== Erebidae ===
- Achaea janata (Linnaeus, 1758)
- Anomis flava Fabricius, 1775
- Anomis hawaiiensis (Butler, 1882)
- Anomis noctivolans (Butler, 1880)
- Anomis vulpicolor (Meyrick, 1928)
- Antiblemma acclinalis Hübner, 1823sim
- Ascalapha odorata (Linnaeus, 1758)
- Bocana manifestalis Walker, 1858
- Eublemma accedens (Felder & Rogenhofer, 1874)
- Eudocima phalonia (Linnaeus, 1763)
- Galtara extensa (Butler, 1880)
- Hypena laceratalis Walker, 1859
- Hypena laysanensis (Swezey, 1914)
- Hypena newelli (Swezey, 1912)
- Hypena obsoleta Butler, 1877
- Hypena plagiota (Meyrick, 1899)
- Hypena senicula (Meyrick, 1928)
- Hypocala deflorata (Fabricius, 1794)
- Hypocala velans Walker, 1857
- Melipotis indomita (Walker, 1858)
- Ophiusa disjungens (Walker, 1858)
- Oraesia excavata (Butler, 1878)
- Pandesma anysa Guenée, 1852
- Pericyma cruegeri (Butler, 1886)
- Polydesma boarmoides Guenée, 1852
- Pseudoschrankia
- Schrankia altivolans (Butler, 1880)
- Schrankia howarthi D. Davis & Medeiros, 2009
- Simplicia cornicalis (Fabricius, 1794)

=== Euteliidae ===
- Penicillaria jocosatrix Guenée, 1852
- Stictoptera cucullioides Guenée, 1852
- Targalla delatrix (Guenée, 1852)

=== Noctuidae ===
- Acrapex exanimis (Meyrick, 1899)
- Acrapex mischus D. S. Fletcher, 1959
- Agrotis arenivolans Butler, 1879
- Agrotis aulacias Meyrick, 1899
- Agrotis baliopa Meyrick, 1899
- Agrotis bryani (Swezey, 1926)
- Agrotis ceramophaea Meyrick, 1899
- Agrotis charmocrita (Meyrick, 1928)
- Agrotis cremata (Butler, 1880)
- Agrotis crinigera (Butler, 1881)
- Agrotis dislocata (Walker, 1856)
- Agrotis epicremna Meyrick, 1899
- Agrotis evanescens (Rothschild, 1894)
- Agrotis fasciata (Rothschild, 1894)
- Agrotis giffardi (Swezey, 1932)
- Agrotis hephaestaea (Meyrick, 1899)
- Agrotis ipsilon (Hufnagel, 1766)
- Agrotis kerri (Swezey, 1920)
- Agrotis laysanensis (Rothschild, 1894)
- Agrotis melanoneura Meyrick, 1899
- Agrotis mesotoxa Meyrick, 1899
- Agrotis microreas Meyrick, 1899
- Agrotis panoplias Meyrick, 1899
- Agrotis perigramma Meyrick, 1899
- Agrotis photophila (Butler, 1879)
- Agrotis procellaris Meyrick, 1900
- Agrotis psammophaea Meyrick, 1899
- Agrotis tephrias Meyrick, 1899
- Agrotis xiphias Meyrick, 1899
- Amyna axis (Guenée, 1852)
- Amyna natalis (Walker, 1858)
- Anarta decepta Grote, 1883
- Arcte coerula (Guenée, 1852)
- Argyrogramma verruca (Fabricius, 1794)
- Athetis thoracica (Moore, 1884)
- Aumakua
- Callopistria floridensis (Guenée, 1852)
- Chloridea virescens (Fabricius, 1777)
- Chrysodeixis eriosoma (Doubleday, 1843)
- Condica dolorosa (Walker, 1865)
- Condica illecta (Walker, 1865)
- Ctenoplusia albostriata (Bremerc & Grey, 1853)
- Elaphria nucicolora (Guenee, 1852)
- Feltia subterranea (Fabricius, 1794)
- Haliophyle
- Helicoverpa confusa Hardwick, 1965
- Helicoverpa hawaiiensis (Quaintance & Brues, 1905)
- Helicoverpa minuta Hardwick, 1965
- Helicoverpa pallida Hardwick, 1965
- Helicoverpa zea (Boddie, 1850)
- Heliothis melanoleuca Mitchell, 1997
- Leucania scottii (Butler, 1886)
- Leucania striata Leech, 1900
- Leucania stenographa (Lower, 1900)
- Lophoplusia giffardi (Swezey, 1913)
- Lophoplusia psectrocera (Hampson, 1913)
- Lophoplusia pterylota (Meyrick, 1904)
- Lophoplusia violacea (Swezey, 1920)
- Megalographa biloba (Stephens, 1830)
- Mouralia tinctoides Guenée, 1852
- Mythimna amblycasis (Meyrick, 1899)
- Mythimna dasuta (Hampson, 1905)
- Mythimna macrosaris (Meyrick, 1899)
- Mythimna unipuncta (Haworth, 1809)
- Neogalea sunia Guenée, 1852
- Peridroma albiorbis (Warren, 1912)
- Peridroma chersotoides (Butler, 1881)
- Peridroma cinctipennis (Butler, 1881)
- Peridroma coniotis (Hampson, 1903)
- Peridroma neurogramma (Meyrick, 1899)
- Peridroma saucia (Hübner, 1808)
- Peridroma selenias (Meyrick, 1899)
- Spodoptera exempta Walker, 1856
- Spodoptera exigua (Hübner, 1808)
- Spodoptera litura (Fabricius, 1775)
- Spodoptera mauritia (Boisduval, 1833)
- Trichoplusia ni (Hübner, [1803])

=== Nolidae ===
- Meganola brunellus (Hampson, 1893)

=== Sphingidae ===
- Agrius cingulata (Fabricius, 1775)
- Daphnis nerii (Linnaeus, 1758)
- Hippotion rosetta (Swinhoe, 1892)
- Hyles calida (Butler, 1881)
  - Hyles calida calida
  - Hyles calida hawaiiensis
- Hyles lineata (Fabricius, 1775)
- Hyles perkinsi (Swezey, 1920)
- Hyles wilsoni (Rothschild, 1894)
- Macroglossum pyrrhostictum Butler, 1875
- Manduca blackburni (Butler, 1880)
- Psilogramma increta (Walker 1865) (formerly misidentified as Psilogramma menephron)
- Theretra nessus (Drury, 1773)
- Tinostoma smaragditis (Meyrick, 1899)

== Micro moths ==
=== Alucitidae ===
- Alucita objurgatella (Walsingham, 1907)

=== Austostichidae ===
- Autosticha pelodes (Meyrick, 1883)
- Oecia oecophila (Staudinger, 1876)
- Stoeberhinus testaceus Butler, 1881

=== Batrachedridae ===
- Batrachedrodes
- Chedra microstigma (Walsingham, 1907)
- Chedra mimica Zimmerman, 1978

=== Bedelliidae ===
- Bedellia boehmeriella Swezey, 1912
- Bedellia oplismeniella Swezey, 1912
- Bedellia orchilella Walsingham, 1907
- Bedellia struthionella Walsingham, 1907
- 10 undescribed Bedellia species

=== Blastobasidae ===
- Blastobasis inana (Butler, 1881)

=== Bucculatricidae ===
- Bucculatrix thurberiella Busck, 1914

=== Carposinidae ===
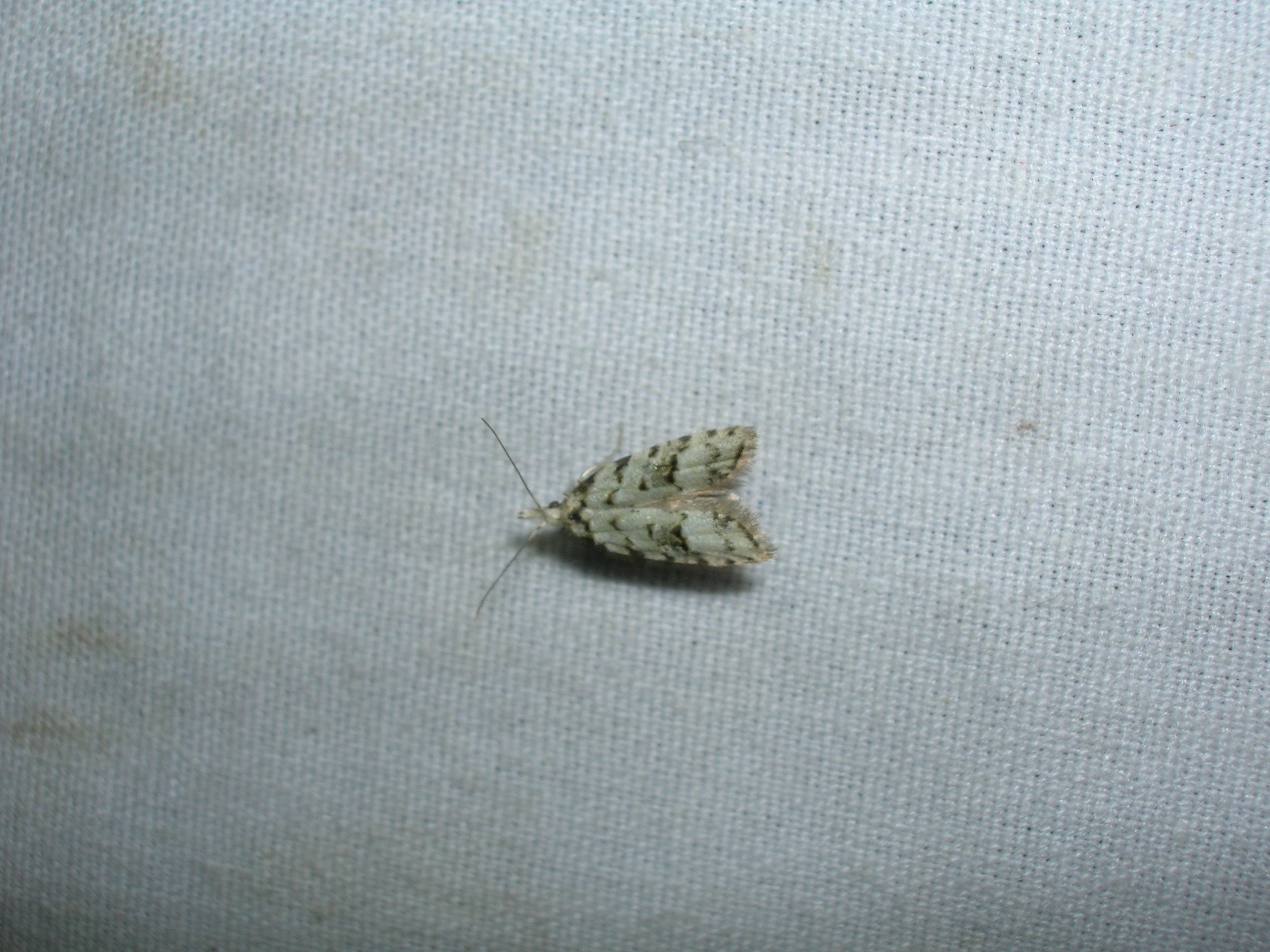
Carposina sp.

- Carposina achroana (Meyrick, 1883)
- Carposina atronotata (Walsingham, 1907)
- Carposina benigna Meyrick, 1913
- Carposina bicincta (Walsingham, 1907)
- Carposina cervinella (Walsingham, 1907)
- Carposina corticella (Walsingham, 1907)
- Carposina crinifera (Walsingham, 1907)
- Carposina dispar (Walsingham, 1907)
- Carposina distincta (Walsingham, 1907)
- Carposina divaricata (Walsingham, 1907)
- Carposina ferruginea (Walsingham, 1907)
- Carposina gemmata (Walsingham, 1907)
- Carposina glauca Meyrick, 1913
- Carposina gracillima (Walsingham, 1907)
- Carposina graminicolor (Walsingham, 1907)
- Carposina graminis (Walsingham, 1907)
- Carposina herbarum (Walsingham, 1907)
- Carposina inscripta (Walsingham, 1907)
- Carposina irrorata (Walsingham, 1907)
- Carposina lacerata Meyrick, 1913
- Carposina latifasciata (Walsingham, 1907)
- Carposina mauii (Walsingham, 1907)
- Carposina nigromaculata (Walsingham, 1907)

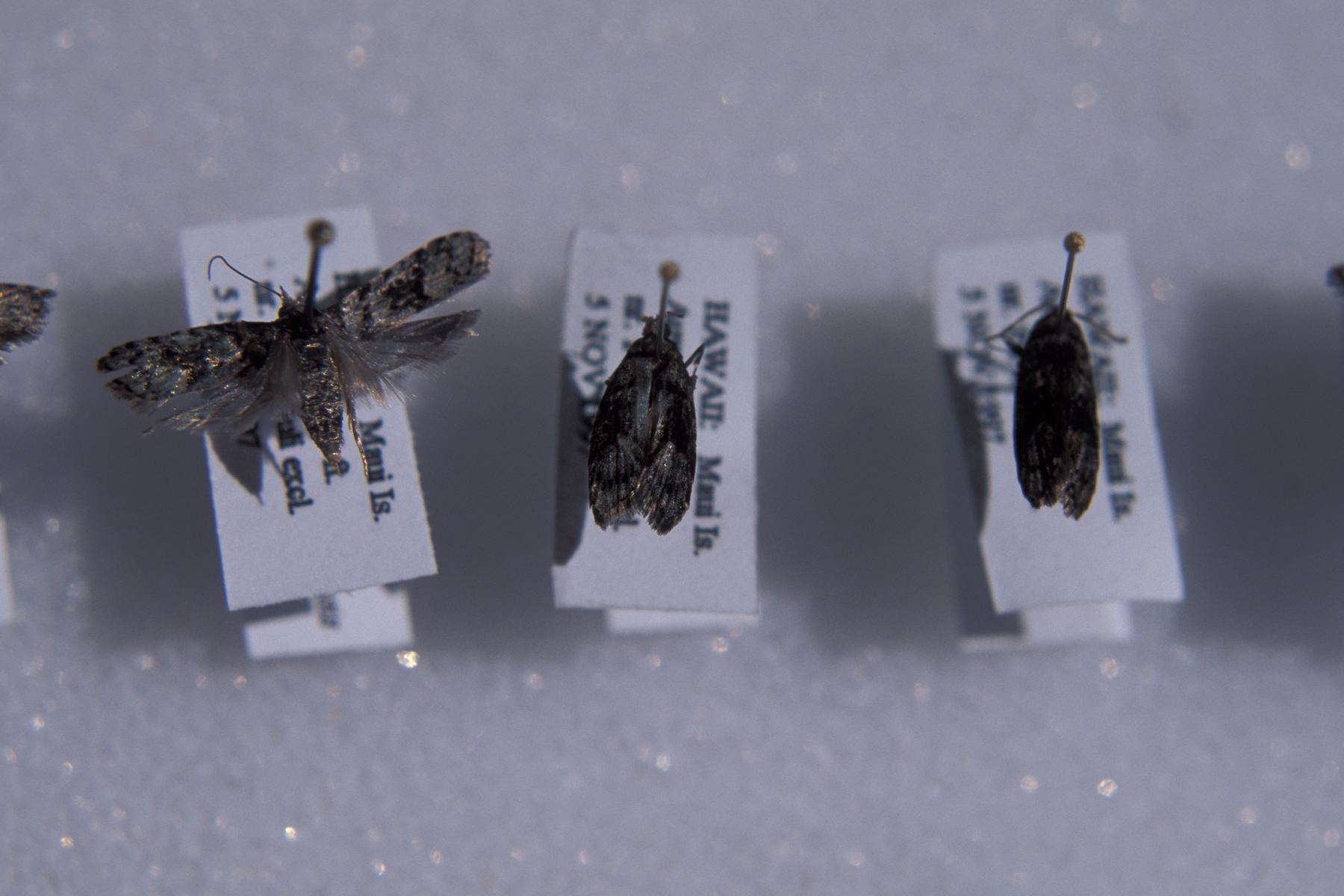
Carposina nigronotata

- Carposina nigronotata (Walsingham, 1907)
- Carposina olivaceonitens (Walsingham, 1907)
- Carposina piperatella (Walsingham, 1907)
- Carposina plumbeonitida (Walsingham, 1907)
- Carposina punctulata (Walsingham, 1907)
- Carposina pusilla (Walsingham, 1907)
- Carposina pygmaeella (Walsingham, 1907)
- Carposina sasakii Matsumura, 1900
- Carposina saurates Meyrick, 1913
- Carposina semitogata (Walsingham, 1907)
- Carposina solutella (Walsingham, 1907)
- Carposina subolivacea (Walsingham, 1907)
- Carposina subumbrata (Walsingham, 1907)
- Carposina tincta (Walsingham, 1907)
- Carposina togata (Walsingham, 1907)
- Carposina trigononotata (Walsingham, 1907)
- Carposina viridis (Walsingham, 1907)
- 10 undescribed Carposina species

=== Castniidae ===
- Telchin licus (Drury, 1773)

=== Choreutidae ===
- Choreutis sp.

=== Cosmopterigidae ===
- Anatrachyntis badia (Hodges, 1962)
- Anatrachyntis incertulella (Walker 1864)
- Anatrachyntis rileyi (Walsingham, 1882)
- Asymphorodes dimorpha (Busck, 1914)
- Asymphorodes triaula (Meyrick, 1935)
- Hyposmocoma
- Ithome concolorella (Chambers, 1875)
- Trissodoris honorariella (Walsingham, 1907)

=== Crambidae ===
- Asciodes quietalis (Walker, 1859)
- Ategumia fatualis (Lederer, 1863)
- Ategumia matutinalis Guenée, 1854 (formerly misidentified as Ategumia ebulealis)
- Chilo suppressalis (Walker, 1863)
- Diaphania nitidalis (Stoll, in Cramer, [1781])
- Elophila obliteralis (Walker, 1859)
- Euchromius ocelleus (Haworth, 1811)
- Eudonia actias (Meyrick, 1899)
- Eudonia aeolias (Meyrick, 1899)
- Eudonia amphicypella (Meyrick, 1899)
- Eudonia antimacha (Meyrick, 1899)
- Eudonia balanopis (Meyrick, 1899)
- Eudonia bucolica (Meyrick, 1899)
  - Eudonia bucolica bucolica
  - Eudonia bucolica macrophanes
  - Eudonia bucolica pyrseutis
- Eudonia clonodes (Meyrick, 1899)
- Eudonia crataea (Meyrick, 1899)
- Eudonia cryerodes (Meyrick, 1899)
- Eudonia dactyliopa (Meyrick, 1899)
- Eudonia demodes (Meyrick, 1888)
- Eudonia empeda (Meyrick, 1899)
- Eudonia epimystis (Meyrick, 1899)
- Eudonia erebochalca (Meyrick, 1899)
- Eudonia formosa (Butler, 1881)
- Eudonia frigida (Butler, 1881)
- Eudonia geraea (Meyrick, 1899)
- Eudonia gonodecta (Meyrick, 1904)
- Eudonia halirrhoa (Meyrick, 1899)
- Eudonia hawaiiensis (Butler, 1881)
- Eudonia ianthes (Meyrick, 1899)
- Eudonia ischnias (Meyrick, 1888)
- Eudonia isophaea (Meyrick, 1904)
- Eudonia jucunda (Butler, 1881)
- Eudonia loxocentra (Meyrick, 1899)
- Eudonia lycopodiae (Swezey, 1910)
- Eudonia marmarias (Meyrick, 1899)
- Eudonia melanocephala (Meyrick, 1899)
- Eudonia melichlora (Meyrick, 1899)
- Eudonia meristis (Meyrick, 1899)
  - Eudonia meristis meristis
  - Eudonia meristis halmaea
- Eudonia mesoleuca (Meyrick, 1888)
- Eudonia miantis (Meyrick, 1899)
- Eudonia montana (Butler, 1882)
- ?Eudonia nectarias (Meyrick, 1899)
- Eudonia nectarioides (Swezey, 1913)
- Eudonia nyctombra (Meyrick, 1899)
- Eudonia oenopis (Meyrick, 1899)
- Eudonia ombrodes (Meyrick, 1888)
- Eudonia orthoria (Meyrick, 1899)
- Eudonia oxythyma (Meyrick, 1899)
- Eudonia pachysema (Meyrick, 1888)
- Eudonia parachlora (Meyrick, 1899)
- Eudonia passalota (Meyrick, 1899)
- Eudonia pentaspila (Meyrick, 1899)
- Eudonia peronetis (Meyrick, 1899)
- Eudonia platyscia (Meyrick, 1899)
- Eudonia probolaea (Meyrick, 1899)
- Eudonia religiosa (Meyrick, 1904)
- Eudonia rhombias (Meyrick, 1899)
- Eudonia siderina (Meyrick, 1899)
- Eudonia struthias (Meyrick, 1899)
- Eudonia tetranesa (Meyrick, 1899)
- Eudonia thalamias (Meyrick, 1899)
- Eudonia thyellopis (Meyrick, 1899)
- Eudonia triacma (Meyrick, 1899)
- Eudonia tyraula (Meyrick, 1899)
- Eudonia venosa (Butler, 1881)
- Eudonia zophochlora (Meyrick, 1899)
- Glyphodes cyanomichla (Meyrick, 1899)
- Glyphodes perelegans (Meyrick, 1898)
- Hellula undalis (Fabricius, 1794)
- Herpetogramma licarsisalis Walker, 1859
- Hydriris dioctias (Meyrick, 1904)
- Lineodes ochrea Walsingham, 1907
- Maruca vitrata (Fabricius, 1787)
- Mestolobes
- Nomophila noctuella (Denis & Schiffermüller, 1775)

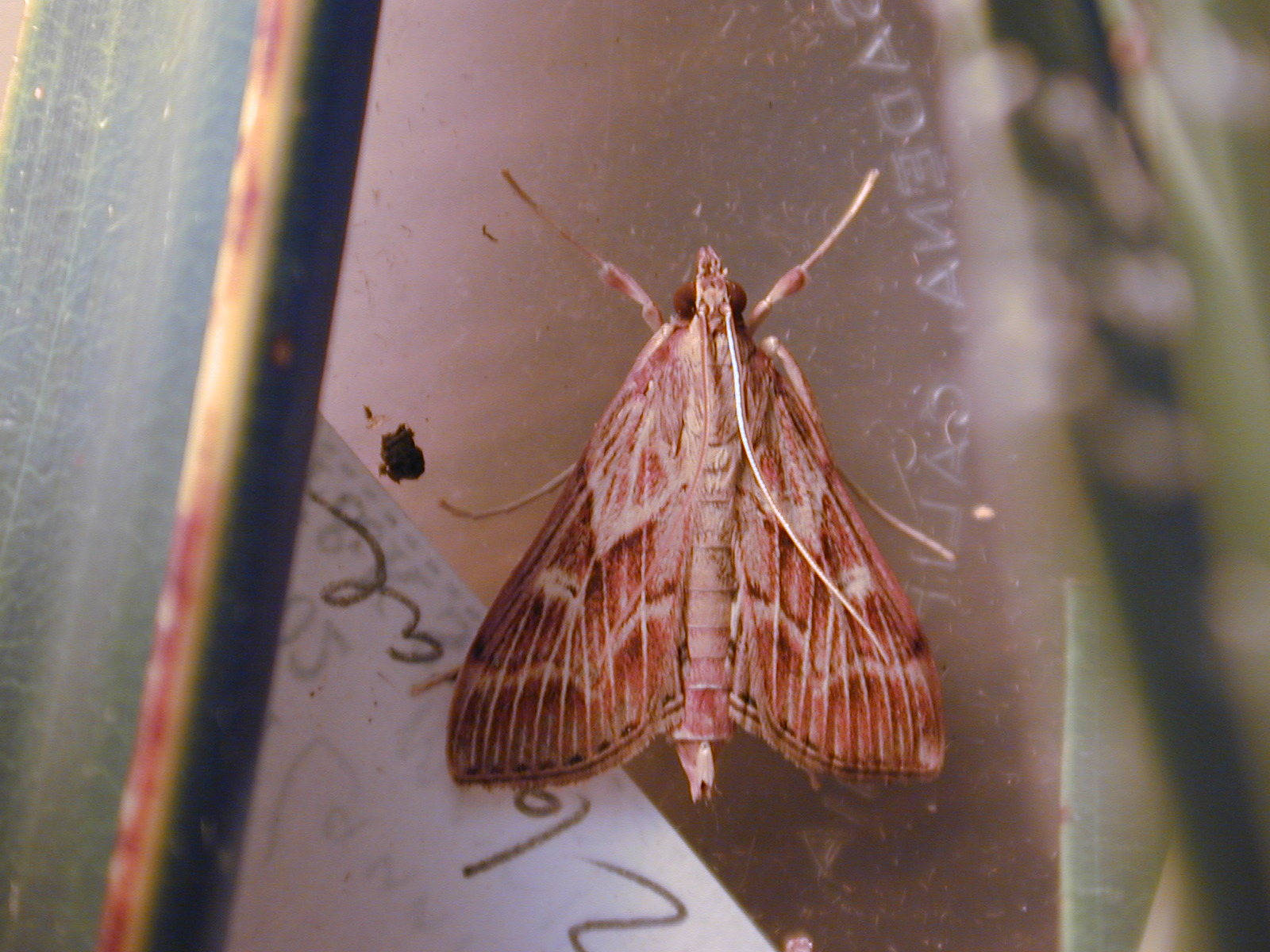
Omiodes blackburni

- Omiodes accepta (Butler, 1877)
- Omiodes anastrepta Meyrick, 1899
- Omiodes anastreptoides Swezey, 1913
- Omiodes antidoxa Meyrick, 1904
- Omiodes asaphombra Meyrick, 1899
- Omiodes blackburni (Butler, 1877)
- Omiodes continuatalis (Wallengren, 1860)
- Omiodes demaratalis (Walker, 1859)
- Omiodes epicentra Meyrick, 1899
- Omiodes euryprora Meyrick, 1899
- Omiodes fullawayi Swezey, 1913
- Omiodes giffardi Swezey, 1921
- Omiodes iridias Meyrick, 1899
- Omiodes laysanensis Swezey, 1914
- Omiodes localis (Butler, 1879)
- Omiodes maia Swezey, 1909
- Omiodes meyricki Swezey, 1907
- Omiodes monogona Meyrick, 1888
- Omiodes monogramma Meyrick, 1899
- Omiodes musicola Swezey, 1909
- Omiodes pritchardii Swezey, 1948
- Omiodes scotaea (Hampson, 1912)
- Omiodes telegrapha Meyrick, 1899
- Omphisa anastomosalis (Guenee, in Boisduval and Guenee, 1854)
- Orphanostigma haemorrhoidalis Guenée 1854
- Orthomecyna
- Parapoynx fluctuosalis (Zeller, 1852)
- Spoladea recurvalis (Fabricius, 1775)
- Stemorrhages exaula (Meyrick, 1888)
- Synclita obliteralis (Walker, 1859)
- Tamsica
- Terastia sp.
- Tulla exonoma (Meyrick, 1899)

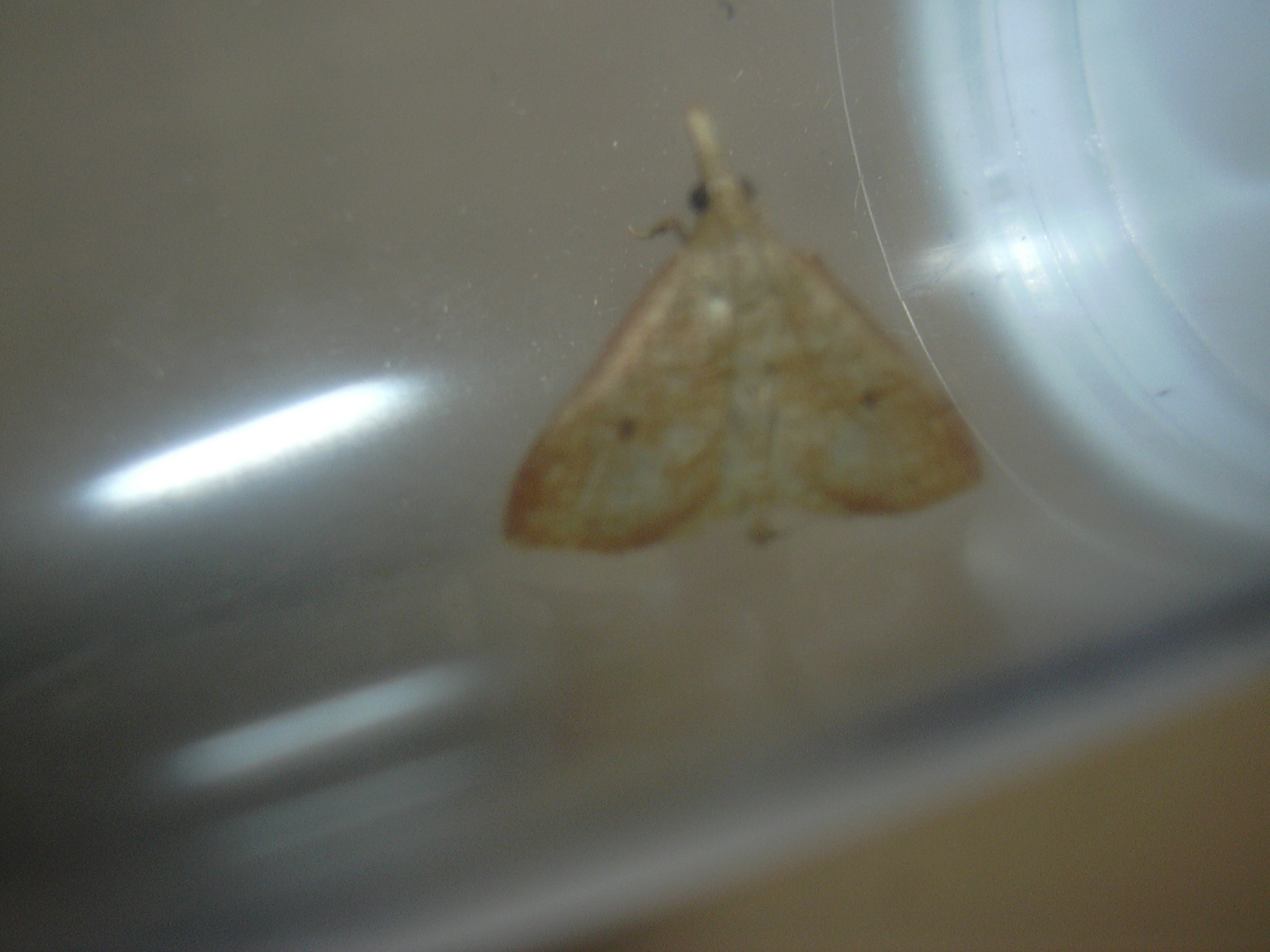
Udea litorea

- Udea argoscelis (Meyrick, 1888)
- Udea aurora (Butler, 1881)
- Udea brontias (Meyrick, 1899)
- Udea bryochloris (Meyrick, 1899)
- Udea calliastra (Meyrick, 1899)
  - Udea calliastra calliastra
  - Udea calliastra hyacinthias
  - Udea calliastra synastra
- Udea caminopis (Meyrick, 1899)
- Udea cataphaea (Meyrick, 1899)
- Udea chalcophanes (Meyrick, 1899)
- Udea chloropis (Meyrick, 1899)
- Udea chytropa (Meyrick, 1899)
- Udea conisalias (Meyrick, 1899)
- Udea constricta (Butler, 1882)
- Udea despecta (Butler, 1877)
- Udea dracontias (Meyrick, 1899)
- Udea dryadopa (Meyrick, 1899)
- Udea endopyra (Meyrick, 1899)
- Udea ennychioides (Butler, 1881)
- Udea ephippias (Meyrick, 1899)
- Udea eucrena (Meyrick, 1888)
- Udea helioxantha (Meyrick, 1899)
- Udea heterodoxa (Meyrick, 1899)
- Udea lampadias (Meyrick, 1904)
- Udea liopis (Meyrick, 1899)
  - Udea liopis liopis
  - Udea liopis rhodias
- Udea litorea (Butler, 1883)
- Udea melanopis (Meyrick, 1899)
- Udea metasema (Meyrick, 1899)
- Udea micacea (Butler, 1881)
- Udea monticolens (Butler, 1882)
- Udea nigrescens (Butler, 1881)
- Udea ommatias (Meyrick, 1899)
- Udea pachygramma (Meyrick, 1899)
- Udea phaethontia (Meyrick, 1899)
- Udea phyllostegia (Swezey, 1946)
- Udea platyleuca (Meyrick, 1899)
- Udea psychropa (Meyrick, 1899)
- Udea pyranthes (Meyrick, 1899)
- Udea rubigalis Guenée (1854)
- Udea stellata (Butler, 1883)
- Udea swezeyi (Zimmerman, 1951)
- Udea thermantis (Meyrick, 1899)
- Udea thermantoides (Swezey, 1913)
- Udea violae (Swezey, 1933)
- Uresiphita gilvata (Fabricius, 1794)
- Usingeriessa onyxalis (Hampson, 1897)

=== Depressariidae ===
- Agonopterix umbellana (Fabricius, 1794)
- Ethmia nigroapicella (Saalmüller, 1880)

=== Dryadaulidae ===
- Dryadaula advena (Zimmerman, 1978)
- Dryadaula terpsichorella (Busck, 1910)

=== Elachistidae ===
- Agonoxena argaula Meyrick, 1921
- Perittia lonicerae (Zimmerman and Bradley, 1950)

=== Gelechiidae ===
- Crasimorpha infuscata Hodges, 1964
- Dichomeris acuminata (Staudinger, in Kalchberg, 1876)
- Dichomeris aenigmatica (Clarke, 1962)
- Keiferia lycopersicella (Walsingham, 1897)
- Merimnetria
- Mesophleps adustipennis (Walsingham, 1897)
- Pectinophora gossypiella Saunders, 1844
- Pectinophora scutigera (Holdaway, 1926)
- Phthorimaea operculella (Zeller, 1873)
- Sitotroga cerealella (Olivier, 1789)

=== Glyphipterigidae ===
- Acrolepia aiea Swezey, 1933
- Acrolepia aureonigrella Walsingham, 1907
- Acrolepia beardsleyi Zimmerman, 1978
- Acrolepia nothocestri Busck, 1914
- Acrolepiopsis sapporensis Matsumura, 1931 (formerly misidentified as Acrolepiopsis assectella)

=== Gracillariidae ===
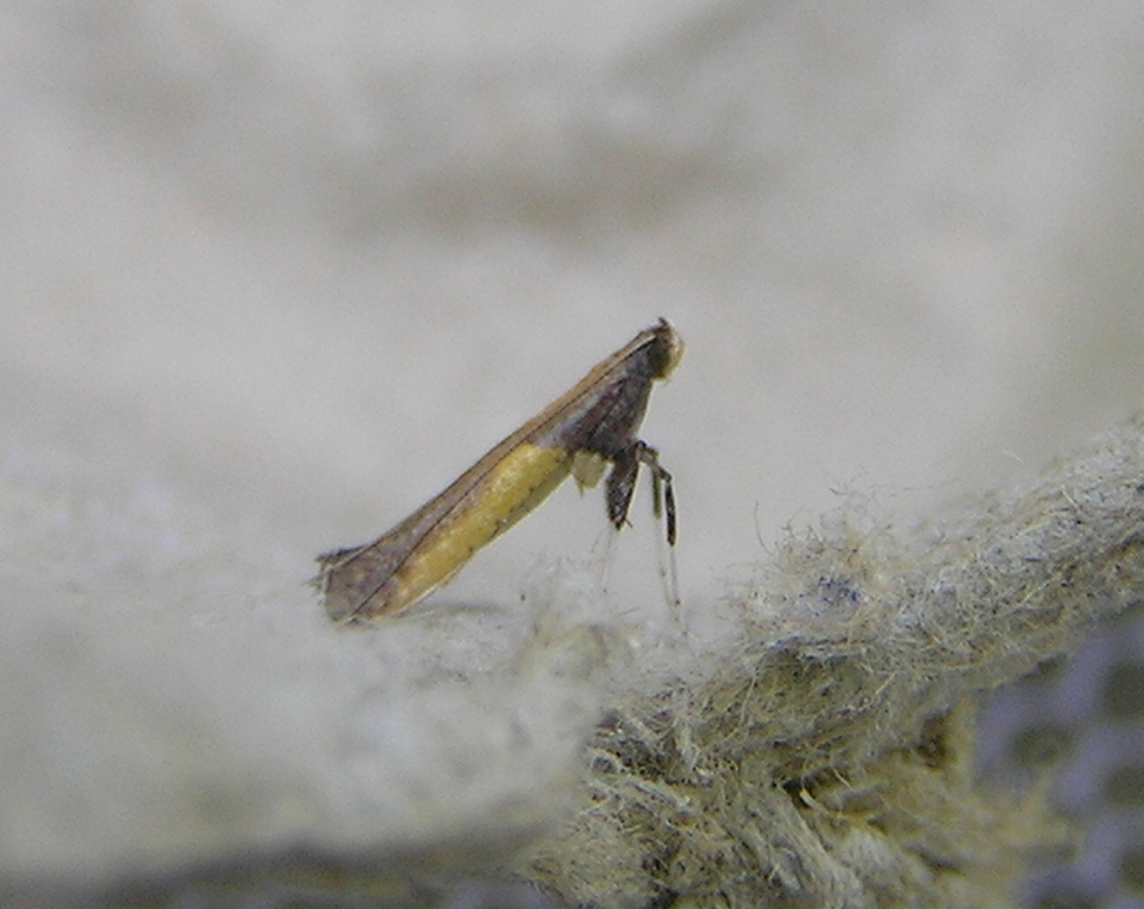
Caloptilia azaleella

- Caloptilia azaleella (Brants, 1913)
- Caloptilia mabaella (Swezey, 1910)
- Cremastobombycia lantanella Busck, 1910
- Philodoria
- Phyllocnistis citrella Stainton, 1856

=== Immidae ===
- Imma mylias Meyrick, 1906

=== Limacodidae ===
- Darna pallivitta (Moore, 1877)

=== Meessiidae ===
- Eudarcia sp.

=== Momphidae ===
- Mompha trithalama Meyrick, 1927

=== Oecophoridae ===
- Endrosis sarcitrella (Linnaeus, 1758)
- Hofmannophila pseudospretella (Stainton, 1849)
- "Leptocroca" sp.

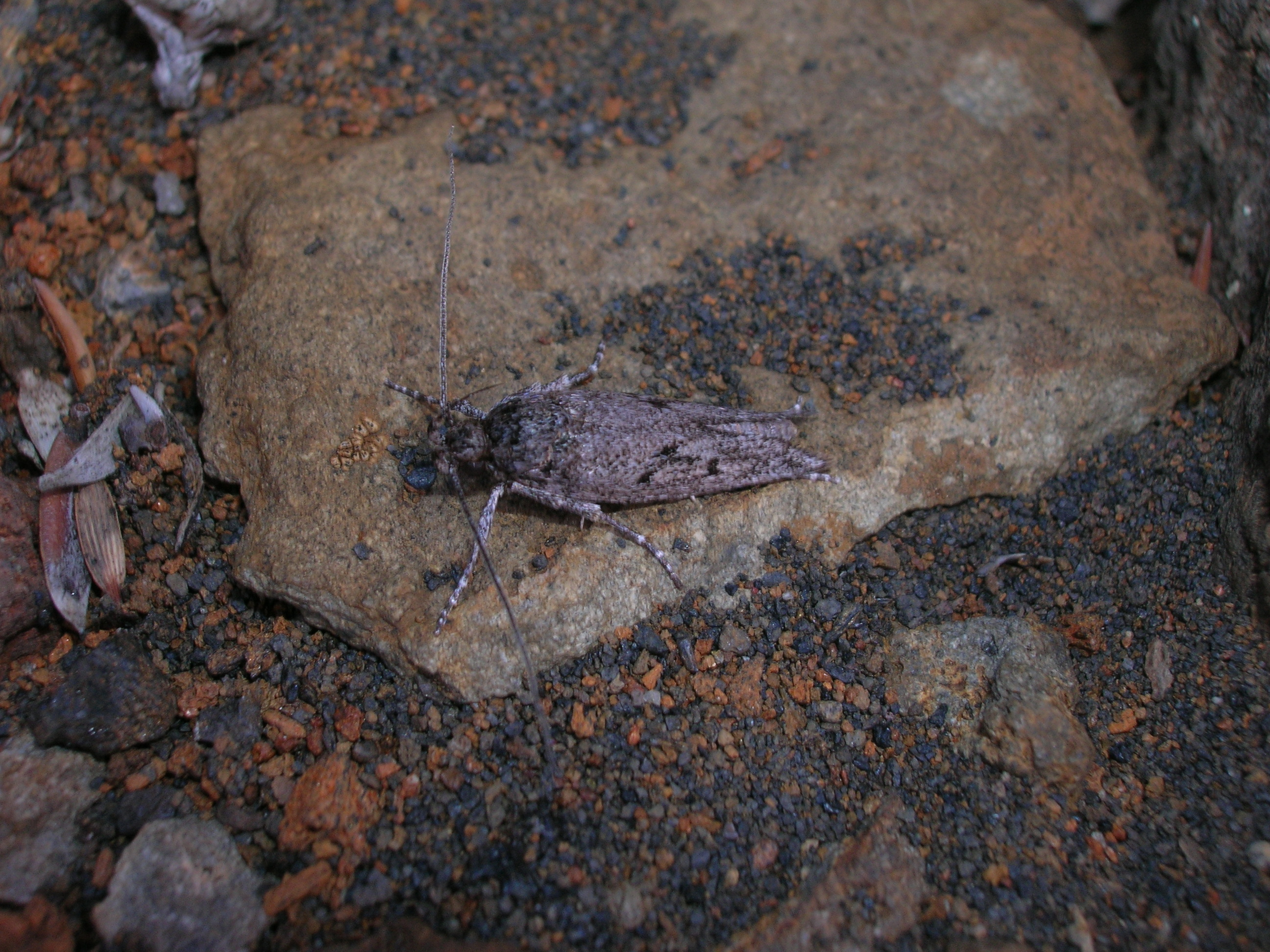
Thyrocopa apatela

=== Opostegidae ===
- Paralopostega

=== Plutellidae ===
- Plutella capparidis Swezey, 1920
- Plutella kahakaha Sattler & Robinson, 2001
- Plutella noholio Sattler & Robinson, 2001
- Plutella xylostella (Linnaeus, 1777)

=== Praydidae ===
- Prays fulvocanella Walshingham, 1907
- Six undescribed Prays species

=== Psychidae ===
- Brachycyttarus griseus de Joannis, 1929

=== Pterophoridae ===
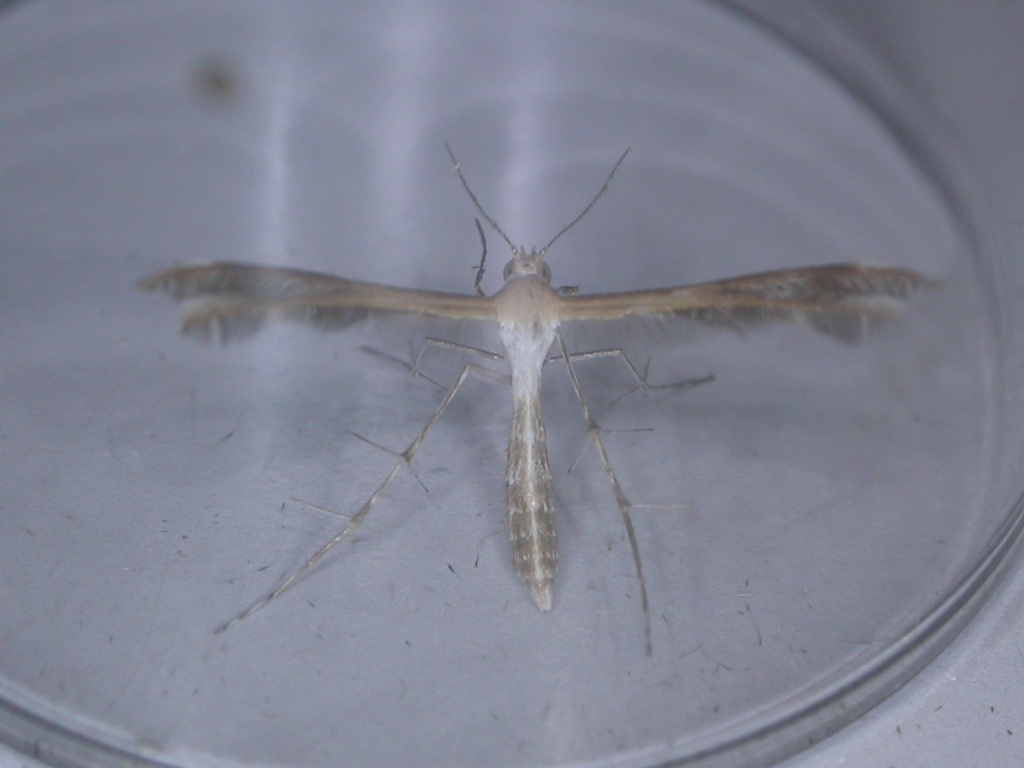
Megalorrhipida leucodactyla

- Anstenoptilia marmorodactyla (Dyar, 1902)
- Diacrotricha fasciola (Zeller, 1851)
- Lantanophaga pusillidactyla (Walker, 1864)
- Hellinsia beneficus (Yano & Heppner, 1983)
- Lioptilodes albistriolatus (Zeller, 1877)
- Megalorrhipida leucodactyla (Fabricius, 1793)
- Stenoptilodes littoralis (Butler, 1882)
  - Stenoptilodes littoralis littoralis
  - Stenoptilodes littoralis rhynchophora
- Stenoptilodes taprobanes (R. Felder & Rogenhofer, 1875)

=== Pyralidae ===
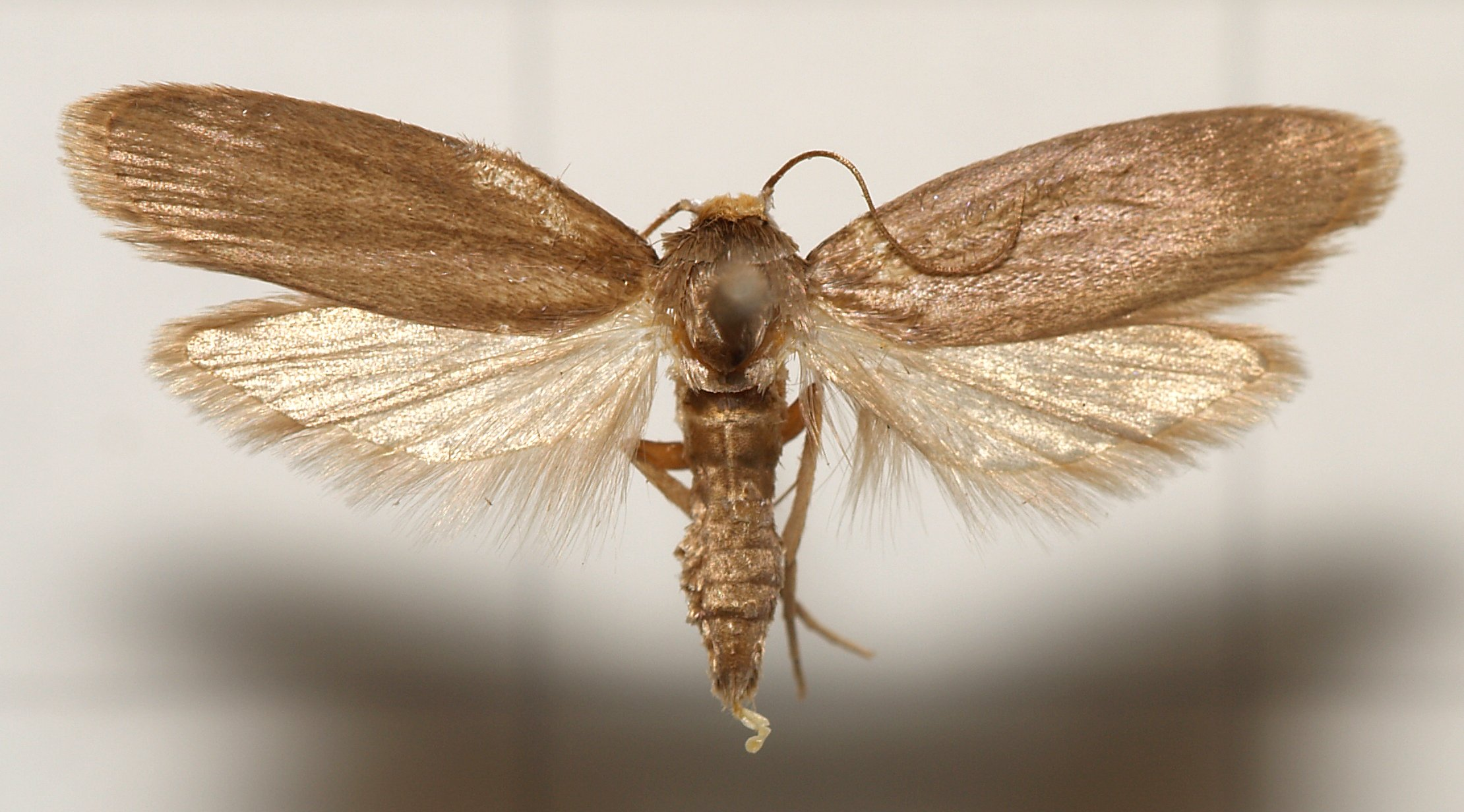
Achroia grisella

- Achroia grisella (Fabricius, 1794)
- Assara albicostalis Walker, 1863
- Cactoblastis cactorum (Berg, 1885)
- Cadra cautella (Walker, 1863)
- Cadra figulilella (Gregson, 1871)
- Corcyra cephalonica (Stainton, 1866)
- Cryptoblabes adoceta Turner, 1904
- Ectomyelois ceratoniae (Zeller, 1839)
- Elasmopalpus lignosellus (Zeller, 1848)
- Ephestia kuehniella Zeller, 1879
- Ephestiodes gilvescentella Ragonot, 1887
- Galleria mellonella (Linnaeus, 1758)
- Genophantis

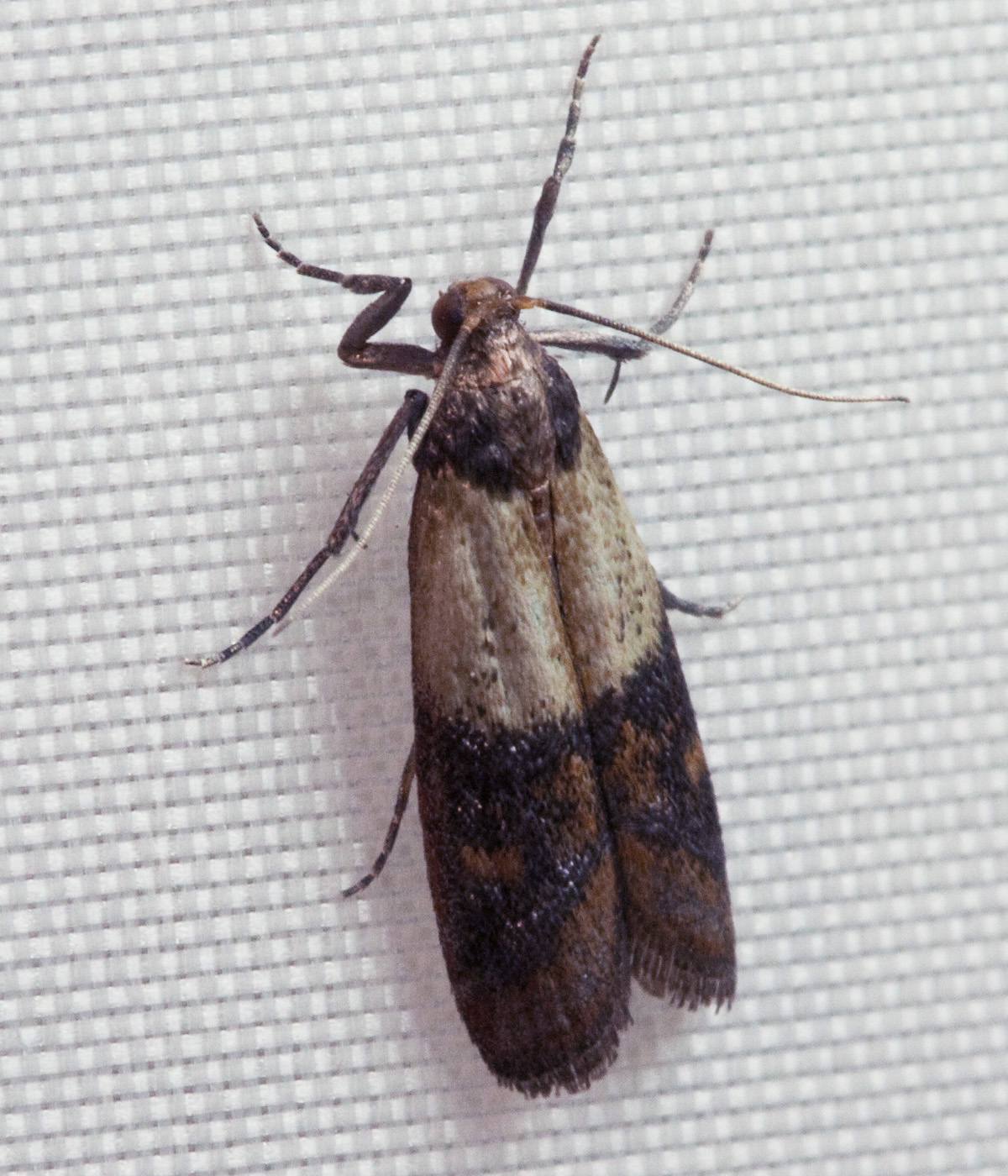
Plodia interpunctella

- Homoeosoma albosparsum (Butler, 1881)
- Hyposopygia mauritialis (Boisduval, 1833)
- Loryma recusata (Walker, 1863)
- Paralipsa gularis (Zeller, 1877)
- Plodia interpunctella (Hübner, [1813])
- Pyralis manihotalis Guenee, 1854
- Rhynchephestia rhabdotis Hampson, 1930
- Trachylepidia fructicassiella Ragonot, 1887
- Unadilla bidensana (Swezey, 1933)
- Unadilla humeralis (Butler, 1881)

=== Schreckensteiniidae ===
- Schreckensteinia festaliella (Hübner, [1819])

=== Scythrididae ===
- Mapsidius

=== Sesiidae ===
- Melittia oedipus Oberthür, 1878

=== Tineidae ===
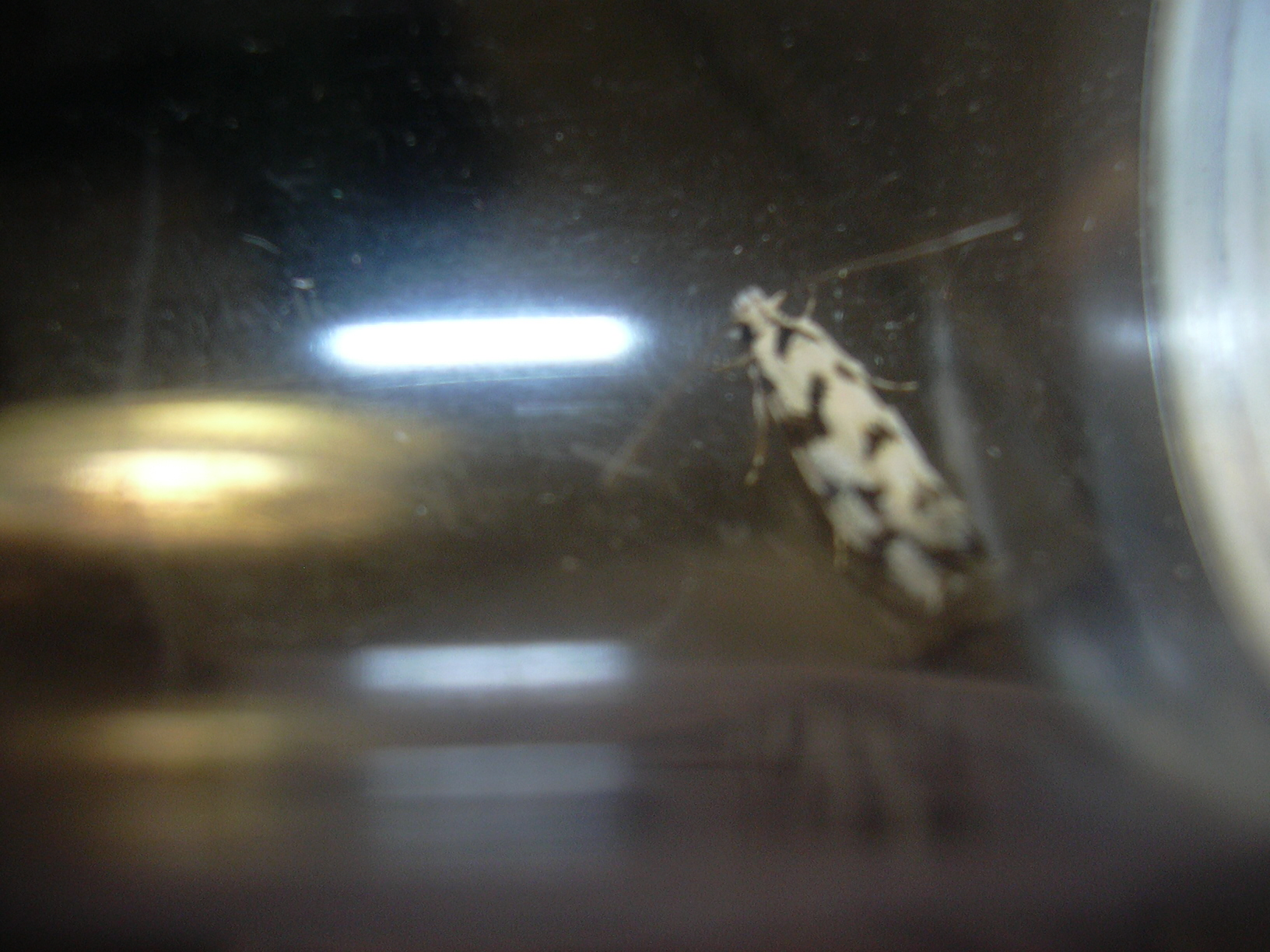
Erechthias simulans

- Crypsithyrodes concolorella (Walker, 1863)
- Erechthias flavistriata (Walsingham, 1907)
- Erechthias kerri (Swezey, 1926)
- Erechthias minuscula (Walsingham, 1897)
- Erechthias pelotricha (Meyrick, 1926)
- Erechthias penicillata (Swezey, 1909)
- Erechthias simulans (Butler, 1882)
- Erechthias zebrina (Butler, 1881)
- Lindera tessellatella Blanchard, 1852
- Mecomodica
- Monopis crocicapitella (Clemens, 1859)(Walker, 1863)
- Monopis longella (Walker, 1863)
- Monopis meliorella (Walker, 1863)
- Nemapogon granella (Linnaeus, 1758)
- Niditinea fuscella (Linnaeus, 1758)
- Oinophila v-flavum (Haworth, 1828)
- Opogona aurisquamosa (Butler, 1881)
- Opogona omoscopa (Meyrick, 1893)
- Opogona purpuriella Swezey, 1913
- Opogona sacchari (Bojer, 1856)
- Phereoeca allutella (Rebel, 1892)
- Phereoeca uterella Walsingham, 1897
- Praeacedes atomosella (Walker, 1863)
- Setomorpha rutella (Zeller, 1852)
- Tinea pellionella (Linnaeus, 1758)
- Tineola bisselliella (Hummel, 1823)
- Trichophaga mormopis Meyrick, 1935

=== Tortricidae ===
- Acleris zimmermani (Clarke in Zimmerman, 1978)
- Amorbia emigratella Busck, 1909
- Bactra straminea (Butler, 1881)
- Bactra venosana (Zeller, 1847)
- Crocidosema lantana Busck, 1910
- Crocidosema leprara (Walsingham, in Sharp, 1907)
- Crocidosema marcidella (Walsingham, in Sharp, 1907)
- Crocidosema plebejana Zeller, 1847
- Cryptophlebia illepida (Butler, 1882)
- Cryptophlebia ombrodelta (Lower, 1898)
- Cydia chlorostola (Meyrick, 1932)
- Cydia conspicua (Walsingham, 1907)
- Cydia crassicornis (Walsingham, 1907)
- Cydia falsifalcella (Walsingham, 1907)
- Cydia gypsograpta (Meyrick, 1932)
- Cydia latifemoris (Walsingham, 1907)
- Cydia montana (Walsingham, 1907)
- Cydia obliqua (Walsingham, 1907)
- Cydia parapteryx (Meyrick, 1932)
- Cydia plicata (Walsingham, 1907)
- Cydia rufipennis (Butler, 1881)
- Cydia storeella (Walsingham, 1907)
- Cydia walsinghamii (Butler, 1882)
- Eccoptocera foetorivorans (Butler, 1881)
- Eccoptocera osteomelesana (Swezey, 1946)
- Epiphyas postvittana Walker, 1863
- Episimus unguiculus Clarke, 1951
- Eucosmogastra poetica (Meyrick, 1909)
- Grapholita nr. mesoscia
- Lorita scarificata (Meyrick, 1917)
- Macraesthetica
- Mantua fulvosericea (Walsingham, in Sharp, 1907)
- Nuritamburia
- Panaphelix
- Paraphasis perkinsi Walsingham, in Sharp, 1907
- Pararrhaptica
- Platynota rostrana (Walker, 1863)
- Platynota stultana Walsingham, 1884
- Spheterista
- Strepsicrates smithiana Walsingham, 1892

=== Xyloryctidae ===
- "Eumenodora" tetrachorda
- Thyrocopa

== Major works dealing with Hawaiian Lepidoptera ==
- Fauna Hawaiiensis (1899–1913)
- Insects of Hawaii (1948–1992). Volumes 7, 8 and 9.

== See also ==
- Endemism in the Hawaiian Islands
- List of Hawaiian animals extinct in the Holocene
