= Progonostola caustoscia =

Scientific classification
- Kingdom: Animalia
- Phylum: Arthropoda
- Class: Insecta
- Order: Lepidoptera
- Family: Geometridae
- Genus: Progonostola
- Species: P. caustoscia

Binomial name
- Progonostola caustoscia Meyrick, 1899

Synonyms
- Xanthorhoe caustoscia Meyrick, 1899

Species of moth

Progonostola caustoscia is a moth of the family Geometridae. It was first described by Edward Meyrick in 1899. It is endemic to the Hawaiian islands of Maui and Lanai.

In color, size and pattern, this species is similar to Progonostola cremnopis, but it is easily separated, in the male at least, by its bipectinate (comb-like on both sides) antennae.
