= Lophoplusia =

Scientific classification
- Domain: Eukaryota
- Kingdom: Animalia
- Phylum: Arthropoda
- Class: Insecta
- Order: Lepidoptera
- Superfamily: Noctuoidea
- Family: Noctuidae
- Subfamily: Plusiinae
- Tribe: Plusiini
- Subtribe: Plusiina
- Genus: Lophoplusia; Zimmermann, 1958

Genus of moths

Lophoplusia is a genus of moths of the family Noctuidae.

== Species ==
- Lophoplusia giffardi Swezey, 1913
- Lophoplusia psectrocera Hampson, 1913
- Lophoplusia pterylota Meyrick, 1904
- Lophoplusia violacea Swezey, 1920
