= Udea despecta =

Scientific classification
- Domain: Eukaryota
- Kingdom: Animalia
- Phylum: Arthropoda
- Class: Insecta
- Order: Lepidoptera
- Family: Crambidae
- Genus: Udea
- Species: U. despecta

Binomial name
- Udea despecta (Butler, 1877)

Synonyms
- Rhodaria despecta Butler, 1877; Oeobia despecta; Scopula exigua Butler, 1880; Scopula despecta; Pionea despecta; Phlyctaenia despecta; Phlyctaenia campylotheca Swezey, 1946

Species of moth

Udea despecta, the Hawaiian sweetpotato leafroller, is a moth of the family Crambidae. It is endemic to the Hawaiian islands of Kauai, Oahu, Molokai, Maui, Lanai and Hawaii.

The larvae feed on Adenostomma viscosus, Bidens species (including Bidens cosmoides), Ipomoea species, Lipochaeta calycosa and sweet potato. They roll the leaves of their host plant. It is a minor pest on sweet potato.
