= Panaphelix marmorata =

Scientific classification
- Domain: Eukaryota
- Kingdom: Animalia
- Phylum: Arthropoda
- Class: Insecta
- Order: Lepidoptera
- Family: Tortricidae
- Genus: Panaphelix
- Species: P. marmorata

Binomial name
- Panaphelix marmorata Walsingham, 1907

Synonyms
- Panaphelix marmorata var. chrysochroa Walsingham in Sharp, 1907; Panaphelix chrysochroa Walsingham, 1907

Species of moth

Panaphelix marmorata is a moth of the family Tortricidae. It was first described by Lord Walsingham in 1907. It is endemic to the Hawaiian island of Maui.

The wingspan is 32–37 mm, making it one of the largest Hawaiian Tortricidae.
