= Panaphelix asteliana =

Scientific classification
- Domain: Eukaryota
- Kingdom: Animalia
- Phylum: Arthropoda
- Class: Insecta
- Order: Lepidoptera
- Family: Tortricidae
- Genus: Panaphelix
- Species: P. asteliana

Binomial name
- Panaphelix asteliana Swezey, 1932

Species of moth

Panaphelix asteliana is a moth of the family Tortricidae. It was first described by Otto Herman Swezey in 1932. It is endemic to the Hawaiian island of Oahu.

The larvae feed on Astelia veratroides.

The pupa is brown and about 15 mm long.
