= Unadilla bidensana =

Scientific classification
- Kingdom: Animalia
- Phylum: Arthropoda
- Class: Insecta
- Order: Lepidoptera
- Family: Pyralidae
- Genus: Unadilla
- Species: U. bidensana

Binomial name
- Unadilla bidensana (Swezey, 1933)

Synonyms
- Hornoeosoma bidensana Swezey, 1933

Species of moth

Unadilla bidensana is a moth of the family Pyralidae described by Otto Herman Swezey in 1933. It is endemic to the Hawaiian island of Kauai.

The larvae feed on Bidens cosmoides. They bore in the stems of their host plant. The infested stems become swollen and gall-like. Pupation takes place within this swelling.
