= Eudonia lycopodiae =

Scientific classification
- Kingdom: Animalia
- Phylum: Arthropoda
- Class: Insecta
- Order: Lepidoptera
- Family: Crambidae
- Genus: Eudonia
- Species: E. lycopodiae

Binomial name
- Eudonia lycopodiae (Swezey, 1910)

Synonyms
- Scoparia lycopodiae Swezey, 1910

Species of moth

Eudonia lycopodiae is a moth of the family Crambidae described by Otto Herman Swezey in 1910. It is endemic to the Hawaiian island of Oahu.

The larvae feed on Lycopodiella cernua.

The pupa is about 7.5 mm and pale yellowish.
