= Eudonia melichlora =

Scientific classification
- Kingdom: Animalia
- Phylum: Arthropoda
- Class: Insecta
- Order: Lepidoptera
- Family: Crambidae
- Genus: Eudonia
- Species: E. melichlora

Binomial name
- Eudonia melichlora (Meyrick, 1899)

Synonyms
- Scoparia melichlora Meyrick, 1899

Species of moth

Eudonia melichlora is a moth of the family Crambidae. It is endemic to the island of Hawaii.

The larvae feed on moss.
