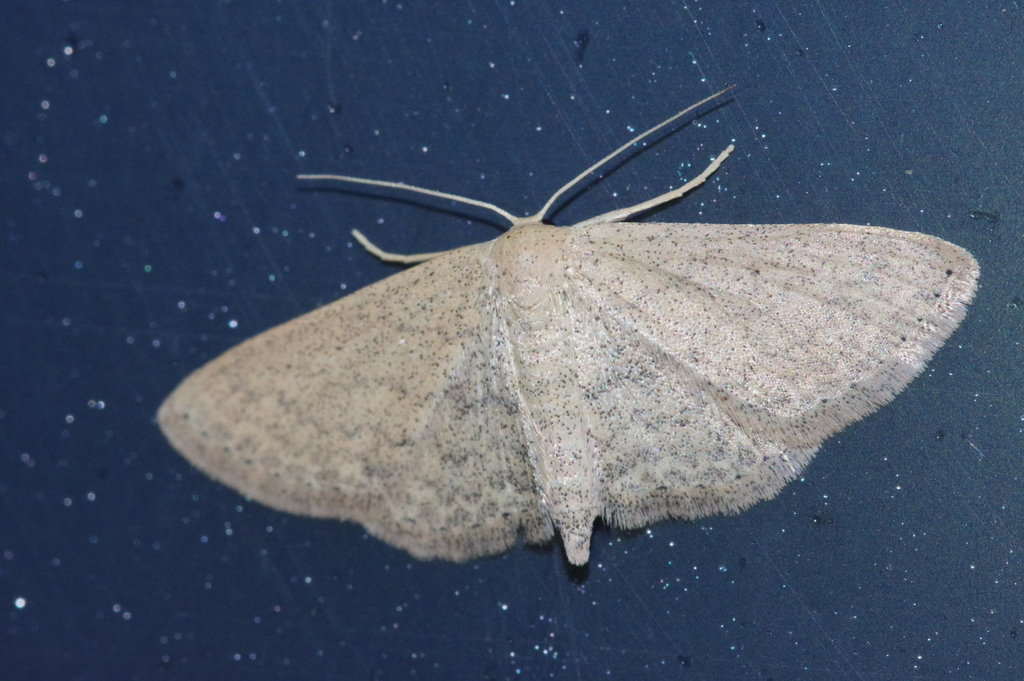

Scientific classification
- Kingdom: Animalia
- Phylum: Arthropoda
- Clade: Pancrustacea
- Class: Insecta
- Order: Lepidoptera
- Family: Geometridae
- Genus: Scopula
- Species: S. personata

Binomial name
- Scopula personata (Prout, 1913)

Synonyms
- Acidalia personata Prout, 1913

= Scopula personata =

Species of geometer moth in subfamily Sterrhinae

Scopula personata is a moth of the family Geometridae. It is found in China, Taiwan, Korea, Japan and the Ryukyu Islands.
