= Dichomeris aenigmatica =

Scientific classification
- Domain: Eukaryota
- Kingdom: Animalia
- Phylum: Arthropoda
- Class: Insecta
- Order: Lepidoptera
- Family: Gelechiidae
- Genus: Dichomeris
- Species: D. aenigmatica

Binomial name
- Dichomeris aenigmatica (Clarke, 1962)

Synonyms
- Trichotaphe aenigmatica Clarke, 1962

Species of moth

Dichomeris aenigmatica is a moth of the family Gelechiidae. It was first described by John Frederick Gates Clarke in 1962. It is native to Mexico, but has been purposely introduced to Hawaii in 1957 to control sour bush.

The wingspan is about 11 mm.

The larvae feed on Pluchea odorata.
