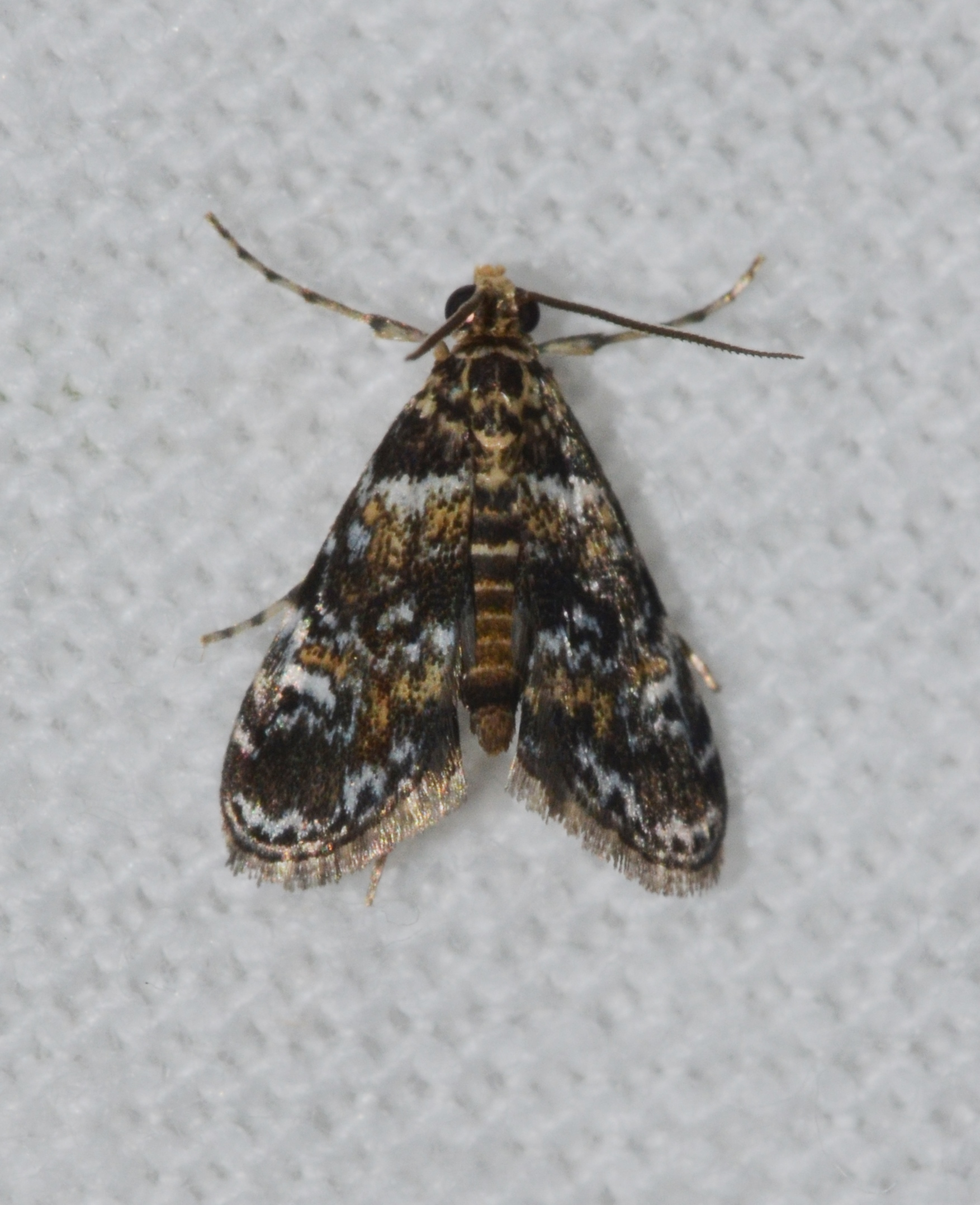

Scientific classification
- Kingdom: Animalia
- Phylum: Arthropoda
- Class: Insecta
- Order: Lepidoptera
- Family: Crambidae
- Genus: Elophila
- Species: E. obliteralis

Binomial name
- Elophila obliteralis (Walker, 1859)

Synonyms
- Isopteryx obliteralis Walker, 1859; Synclita obliteralis; Nymphula obliteralis; Hydrocampa obliteralis; Hydrocampa proprialis Fernald, 1888; Synclita proprialis (Fernald, 1859)

= Elophila obliteralis =

Species of moth

Elophila obliteralis, the waterlily leafcutter moth, is a species of moth of the family Crambidae. It was described by Francis Walker in 1859. It is native to eastern North America. It is an introduced species in Hawaii and South Africa.

The wingspan is 10–22 mm with the male being smaller than the female. Adults are on wing from May to August in North America.

The larvae feed on a wide range of aquatic plants, including Hydrilla verticillata, Eichhornia crassipes, Pistia stratiotes, Nymphaea and Potamogeton species.
