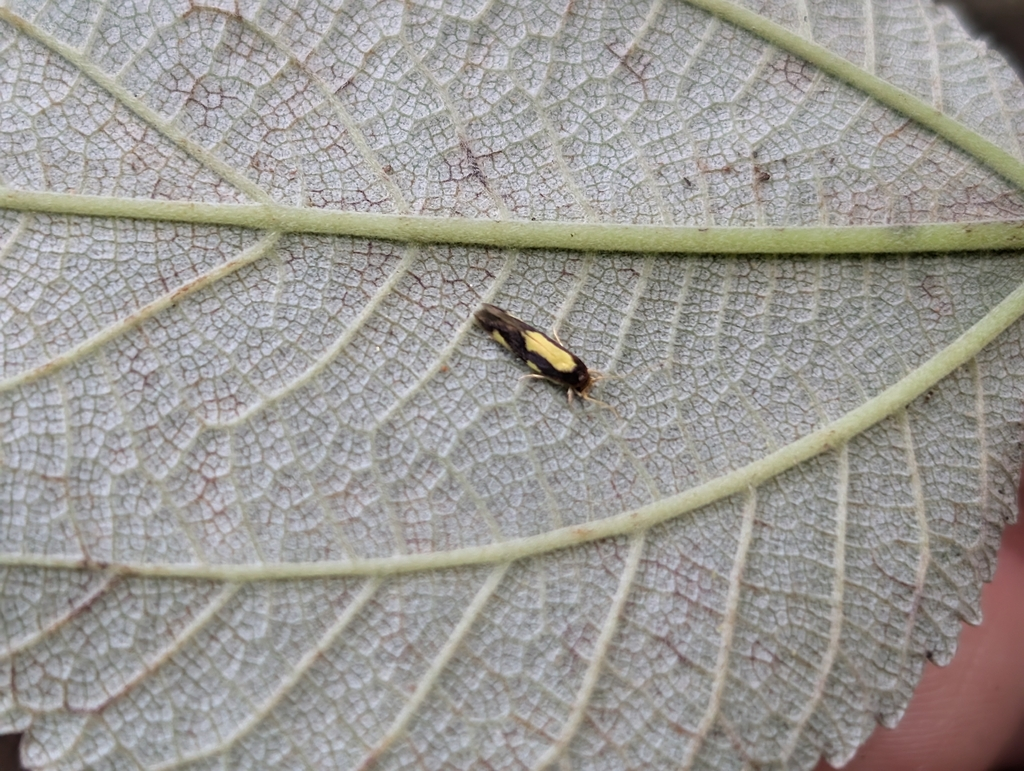

Scientific classification
- Kingdom: Animalia
- Phylum: Arthropoda
- Clade: Pancrustacea
- Class: Insecta
- Order: Lepidoptera
- Family: Tineidae
- Genus: Opogona
- Species: O. purpuriella

Binomial name
- Opogona purpuriella Swezey, 1913

= Opogona purpuriella =

Species of moth

Opogona purpuriella is a moth of the family Tineidae. It was first described by Otto Swezey in 1913. It has been recorded from Hawaii and Tonga. It has also been reported as a port interception in California.

The wingspan is about 10 mm.

The larvae are scavengers and have been reared from dead sugarcane, dead bark of Artocarpus and other decaying vegetable matter, Plumeria, Reynoldsia and Sicana odorifera.
