= Udea nigrescens =

Scientific classification
- Domain: Eukaryota
- Kingdom: Animalia
- Phylum: Arthropoda
- Class: Insecta
- Order: Lepidoptera
- Family: Crambidae
- Genus: Udea
- Species: U. nigrescens

Binomial name
- Udea nigrescens (Butler, 1881)

Synonyms
- Mecyna nigrescens Butler, 1881; Oeobia nigrescens; Melanomecyna nigrescens; Scoparia nigrescens; Pionea nigrescens; Phlyctaenia nigrescens

Species of moth

Udea nigrescens is a moth of the family Crambidae. It is endemic to the Hawaiian islands of Kauai, Oahu, Molokai and Maui.

The larvae feed on Abutilon species, Sida cordifolia and Sida rhombifolia.
