= Lophoplusia pterylota =

Scientific classification
- Kingdom: Animalia
- Phylum: Arthropoda
- Class: Insecta
- Order: Lepidoptera
- Superfamily: Noctuoidea
- Family: Noctuidae
- Genus: Lophoplusia
- Species: L. pterylota

Binomial name
- Lophoplusia pterylota (Meyrick, 1904)

Synonyms
- Plusia pterylota Meyrick, 1904; Phytometra pterylota; Plusia newelli

Species of moth

Lophoplusia pterylota is a moth of the family Noctuidae. It was first described by Edward Meyrick in 1904. It is endemic to the Hawaiian islands of Oahu, Maui and Hawaii.

Larvae have been recorded feeding on hollyhock.
