= Eupithecia stypheliae =

Scientific classification
- Domain: Eukaryota
- Kingdom: Animalia
- Phylum: Arthropoda
- Class: Insecta
- Order: Lepidoptera
- Family: Geometridae
- Genus: Eupithecia
- Species: E. stypheliae

Binomial name
- Eupithecia stypheliae (Swezey, 1948)

Synonyms
- Eucymatoge stypheliae Swezey, 1948

Species of moth

Eupithecia stypheliae is a moth of the family Geometridae. It was first described by Otto Herman Swezey in 1948. It is endemic to the island of Hawaii.

The larvae feed on Styphelia tameiameiae.
