= Cydia obliqua =

Scientific classification
- Kingdom: Animalia
- Phylum: Arthropoda
- Class: Insecta
- Order: Lepidoptera
- Family: Tortricidae
- Genus: Cydia
- Species: C. obliqua

Binomial name
- Cydia obliqua (Walsingham, 1907)

Synonyms
- Enarmonia obliqua Walsingham, 1907; Adenoneura obliqua (Walsingham, 1907)

Species of moth

Cydia obliqua is a moth of the family Tortricidae. It was described by Lord Walsingham in 1907. It is endemic to the island of Hawaii.

Cydia obliqua is known only from three females collected in 1892 at altitudes of 1,200–1,500 m (4,000–5,000 ft) near Kona and Hualālai. It might possibly be just a form of Cydia plicatum. It is presumed extinct. The larvae possibly used Acacia koa or Sophora chrysophylla as the host.
