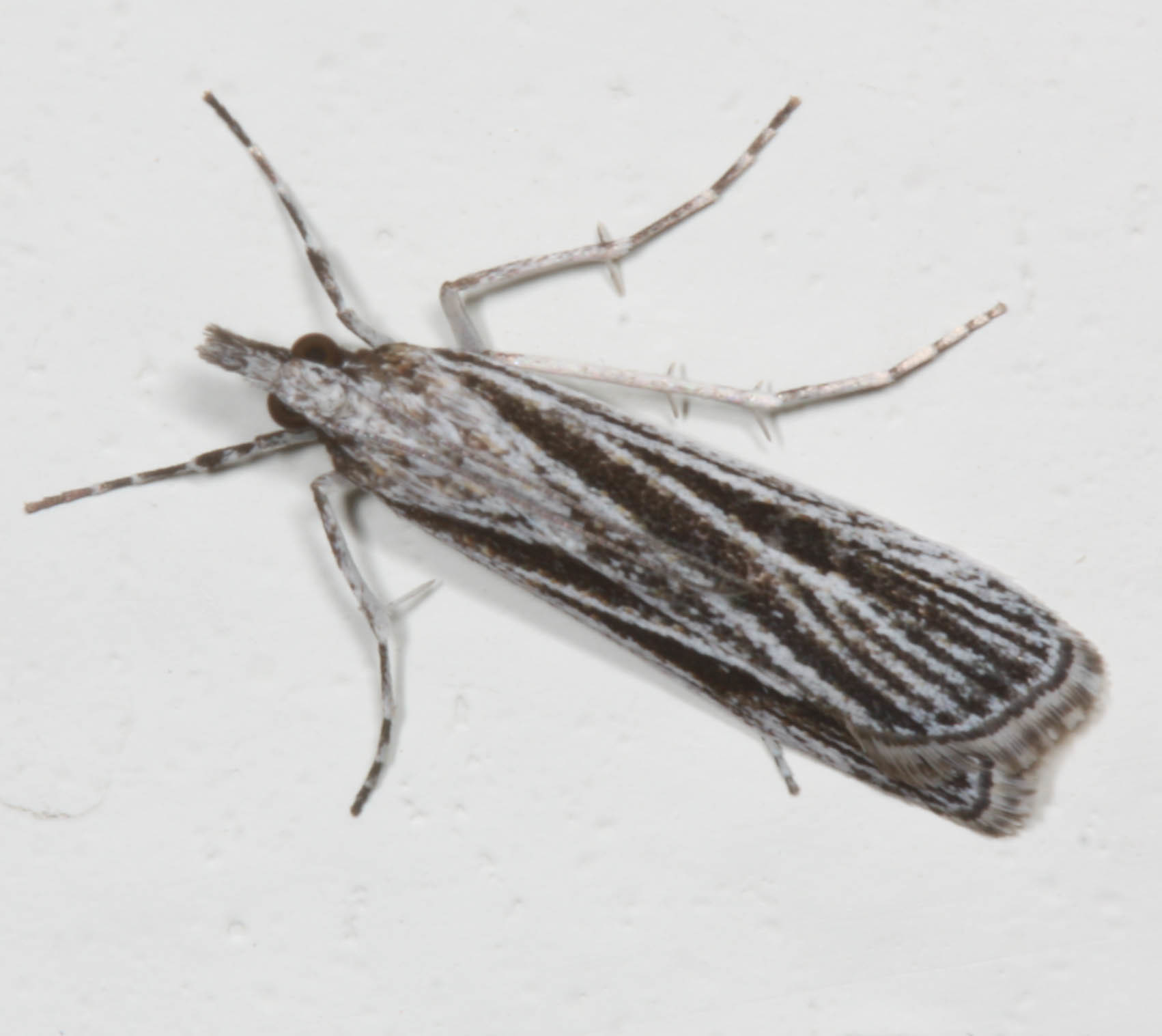

Scientific classification
- Kingdom: Animalia
- Phylum: Arthropoda
- Class: Insecta
- Order: Lepidoptera
- Family: Crambidae
- Genus: Eudonia
- Species: E. venosa

Binomial name
- Eudonia venosa (Butler, 1881)

Synonyms
- Scoparia venosa Butler, 1881; Xeroscopa venosa

= Eudonia venosa =

Species of moth

Eudonia venosa is a moth of the family Crambidae. It is endemic to the Hawaiian islands of Molokai, Maui and Hawaii.
