= Eupithecia rhodopyra =

Scientific classification
- Kingdom: Animalia
- Phylum: Arthropoda
- Class: Insecta
- Order: Lepidoptera
- Family: Geometridae
- Genus: Eupithecia
- Species: E. rhodopyra

Binomial name
- Eupithecia rhodopyra (Meyrick, 1899)

Synonyms
- Eucymatoge rhodopyra Meyrick, 1899

Species of moth

Eupithecia rhodopyra is a moth of the family Geometridae. It was first described by Edward Meyrick in 1899. It is endemic to the Hawaiian island of Kauai.
