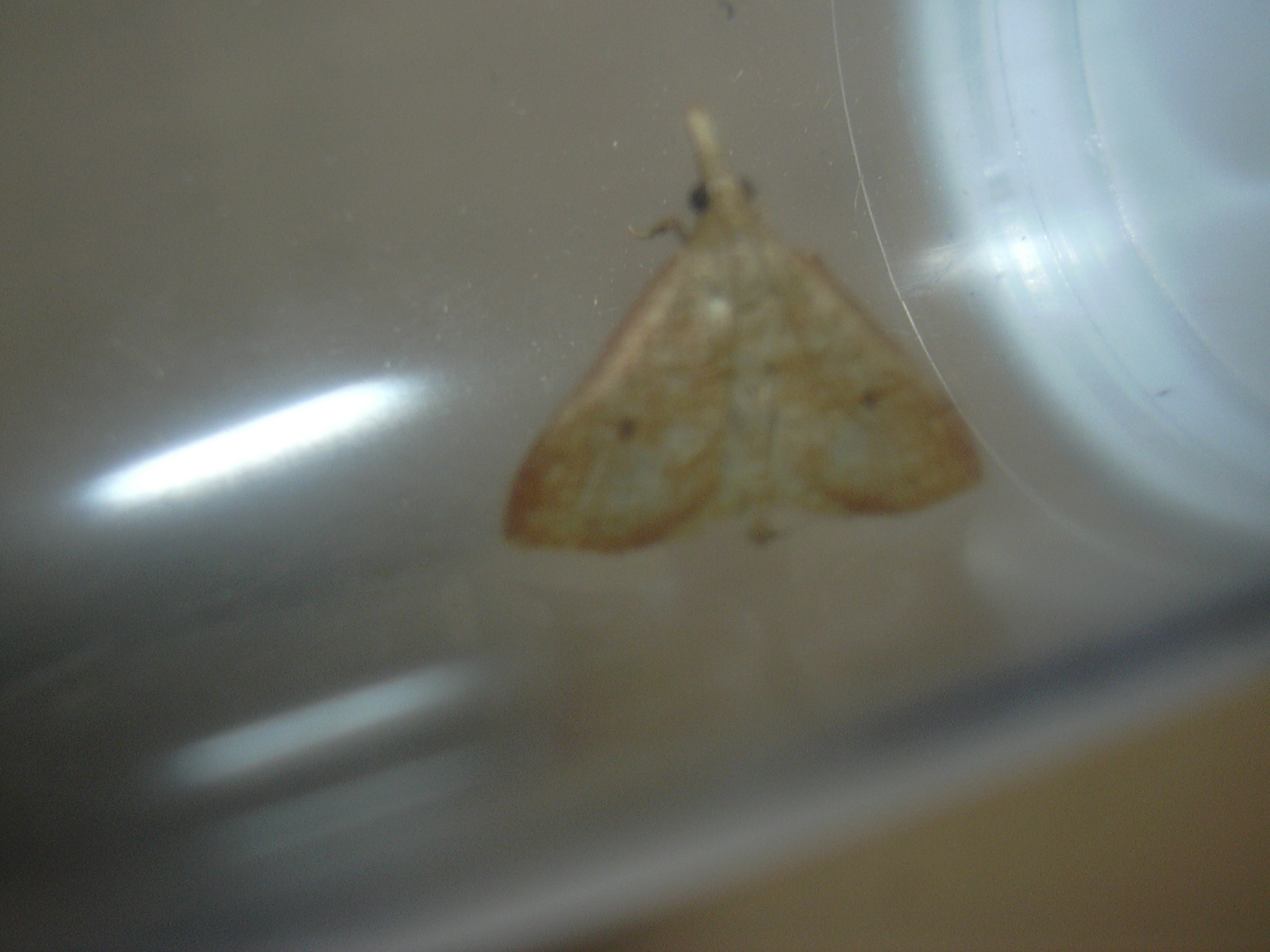

Scientific classification
- Domain: Eukaryota
- Kingdom: Animalia
- Phylum: Arthropoda
- Class: Insecta
- Order: Lepidoptera
- Family: Crambidae
- Genus: Udea
- Species: U. litorea

Binomial name
- Udea litorea (Butler, 1883)

Synonyms
- Scopula litorea Butler, 1883; Oeobia litorea; Eurycreon litorea; Pyrausta litorea; Pionea poliochroa Hampson, 1913

= Udea litorea =

Species of moth

Udea litorea is a moth of the family Crambidae. It is endemic to the Hawaiian islands of Oahu and Lanai.

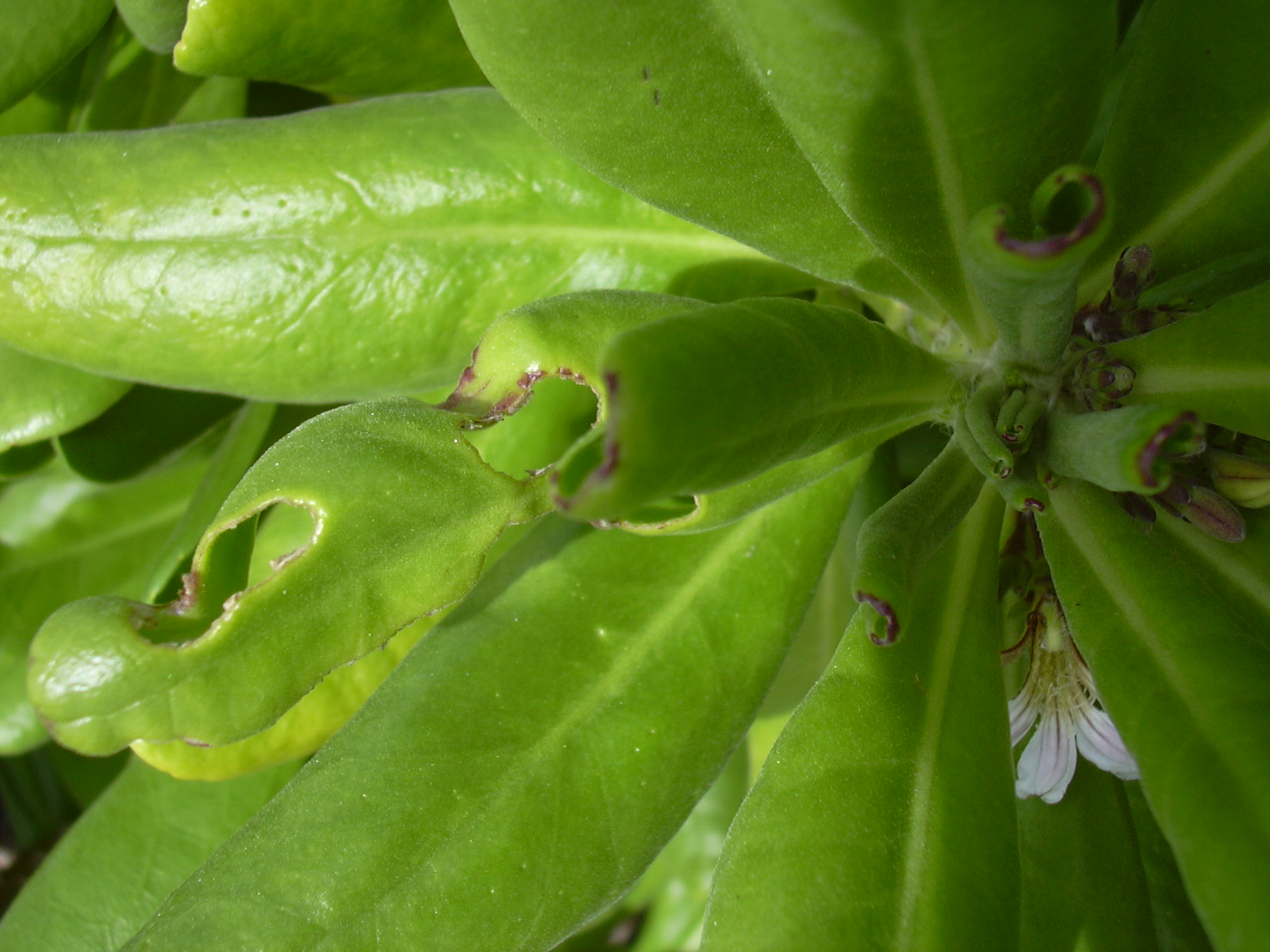
Damage

The larvae feed on Scaevola frutescens.
