= Eudonia frigida =

Scientific classification
- Kingdom: Animalia
- Phylum: Arthropoda
- Class: Insecta
- Order: Lepidoptera
- Family: Crambidae
- Genus: Eudonia
- Species: E. frigida

Binomial name
- Eudonia frigida (Butler, 1881)

Synonyms
- Scoparia frigida Butler, 1881

Species of moth

Eudonia frigida is a moth of the family Crambidae. It is endemic to the Hawaiian islands of Lanai and Maui.
