= Lophoplusia violacea =

Scientific classification
- Domain: Eukaryota
- Kingdom: Animalia
- Phylum: Arthropoda
- Class: Insecta
- Order: Lepidoptera
- Superfamily: Noctuoidea
- Family: Noctuidae
- Genus: Lophoplusia
- Species: L. violacea

Binomial name
- Lophoplusia violacea (Swezey, 1920)

Synonyms
- Phytometra violacea Swezey, 1920; Plusia violacea

Species of moth

Lophoplusia violacea is a moth of the family Noctuidae. It was first described by Otto Herman Swezey in 1920. It is endemic to the Hawaiian island of Kauai.
