= Eupithecia prasinombra =

Scientific classification
- Kingdom: Animalia
- Phylum: Arthropoda
- Class: Insecta
- Order: Lepidoptera
- Family: Geometridae
- Genus: Eupithecia
- Species: E. prasinombra

Binomial name
- Eupithecia prasinombra (Meyrick, 1899)

Synonyms
- Eucymatoge prasinombra Meyrick, 1899

Species of moth

Eupithecia prasinombra is a moth of the family Geometridae. It was first described by Edward Meyrick in 1899. It is endemic to the Hawaiian island of Maui.
