= Eupithecia craterias =

Scientific classification
- Kingdom: Animalia
- Phylum: Arthropoda
- Class: Insecta
- Order: Lepidoptera
- Family: Geometridae
- Genus: Eupithecia
- Species: E. craterias

Binomial name
- Eupithecia craterias (Meyrick, 1899)

Synonyms
- Eucymatoge craterias Meyrick, 1899; Eupithecia cratenas (misspelling); Eucymatoge ditrecta Meyrick, 1899

Species of moth

Eupithecia craterias is a moth of the family Geometridae. It was first described by Edward Meyrick in 1899. It is endemic to the state of Hawaii.

== Subspecies ==
There are two recognised subspecies:

- Eupithecia craterias craterias (Meyrick, 1899) (Oahu, Molokai, Maui)
- Eupithecia craterias ditrecta (Meyrick, 1899) (Hawaii)
