= Lophoplusia giffardi =

Scientific classification
- Domain: Eukaryota
- Kingdom: Animalia
- Phylum: Arthropoda
- Class: Insecta
- Order: Lepidoptera
- Superfamily: Noctuoidea
- Family: Noctuidae
- Genus: Lophoplusia
- Species: L. giffardi

Binomial name
- Lophoplusia giffardi (Swezey, 1913)

Synonyms
- Plusia giffardi Swezey, 1913; Phytometra giffardi

Species of moth

Lophoplusia giffardi is a moth of the family Noctuidae. It was first described by Otto Herman Swezey in 1913. It is endemic to the Hawaiian islands of Molokai, Maui and Hawaii.
