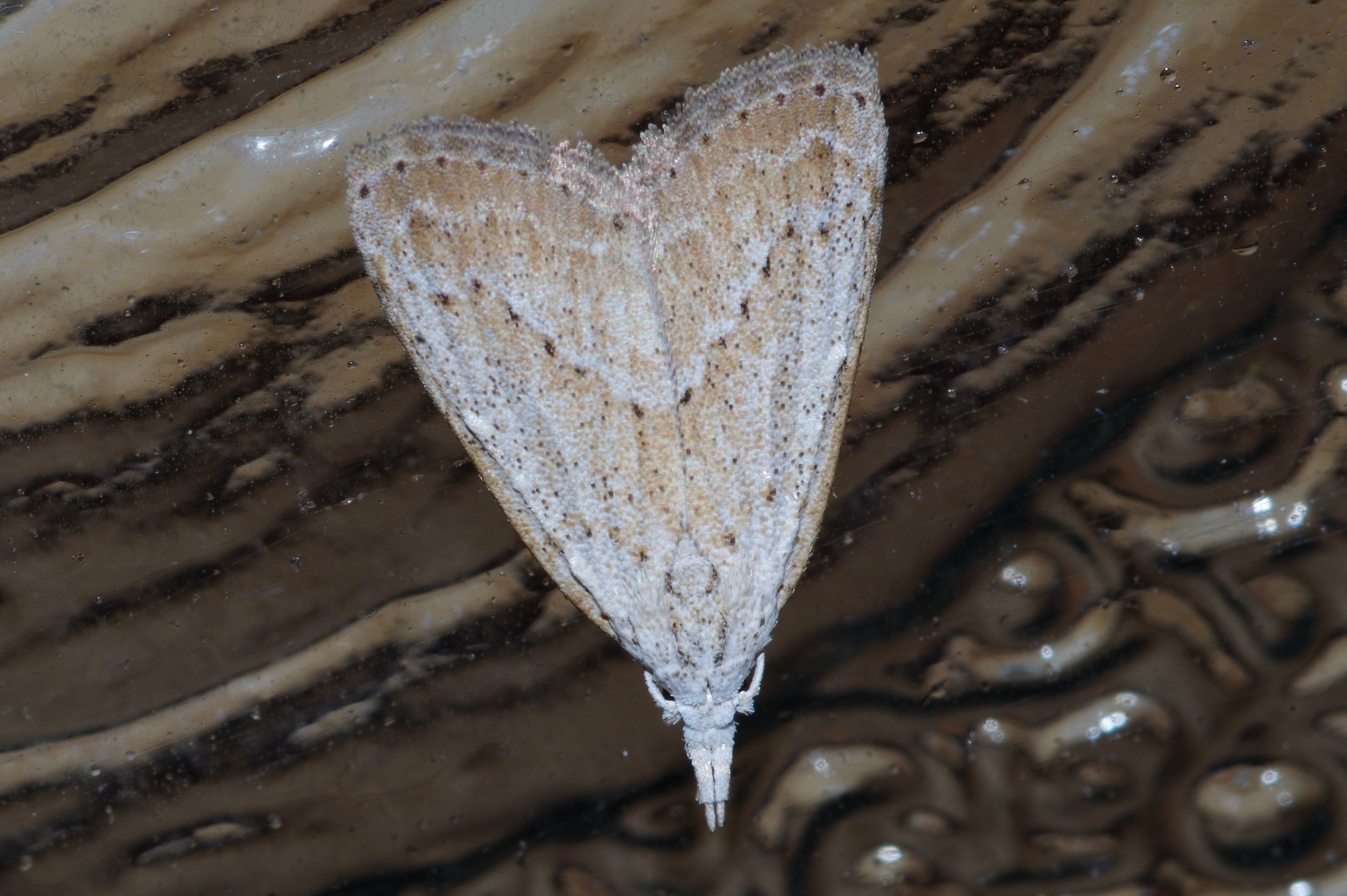

Scientific classification
- Kingdom: Animalia
- Phylum: Arthropoda
- Clade: Pancrustacea
- Class: Insecta
- Order: Lepidoptera
- Superfamily: Noctuoidea
- Family: Nolidae
- Genus: Meganola
- Species: M. brunellus

Binomial name
- Meganola brunellus (Hampson, 1893)

Synonyms
- Meganola brunella; Roeselia brunellus Hampson, 1893; Roeselia brunella; Manoba brunellus (Hampson, 1893); Manoba brunella; Rhynchopalpus brunellus (Hampson, 1893); Rhynchopalpus brunella; Selca brunellus; Selca brunella; Nola brunellus; Nola brunella; Nola achromia Hampson, 1909; Celamoides corticella van Eecke, 1926; Meganola pseudohypena Inoue, 1982

= Meganola brunellus =

Species of moth

Meganola brunellus is a moth of the family Nolidae. It is found in Sri Lanka, India, Taiwan, Japan, the Ryukyu Islands, Sundaland, Queensland and the Bismarck Islands. It is an introduced species in Hawaii.

== Taxonomy ==
The taxonomic placement of this species has been problematic. It has been included in the Arctiidae, Nolidae or Noctuidae. Poole transferred brunellus to Nola in 1989, but the male genitalia are atypical of this genus.

== Description ==
Its wingspan is 21 mm. The head and thorax are white, slightly irrorated (sprinkled) with black and collar black banded. Abdomen brownish white. Forewings suffused with pale brown and black irrorated. Oblique antemedial and postmedial black specks series present. A marginal series of specks can be seen, with traces of a pale submarginal line visible. The brown suffusion very dark on costa before postmedial specks and on the margin, more prominent in some specimens than others. Hindwings white or ochreous.

== Ecology ==
The larvae feed on Melastoma species, including Melastoma candidum, around forests or domestic areas.
