= Cydia storeella =

Scientific classification
- Kingdom: Animalia
- Phylum: Arthropoda
- Class: Insecta
- Order: Lepidoptera
- Family: Tortricidae
- Genus: Cydia
- Species: C. storeella

Binomial name
- Cydia storeella (Walsingham, 1907)

Synonyms
- Enarmonia storeella Walsingham, 1907; Adenoneura storeella

Species of moth

Cydia storeella is a moth of the family Tortricidae. It was first described by Lord Walsingham in 1907. It is endemic to the Hawaiian island of Maui.

It is known only from a single female and is possibly extinct. It might also be just a form of Cydia plicatum.
