= Unadilla humeralis =

Scientific classification
- Kingdom: Animalia
- Phylum: Arthropoda
- Class: Insecta
- Order: Lepidoptera
- Family: Pyralidae
- Genus: Unadilla
- Species: U. humeralis

Binomial name
- Unadilla humeralis (Butler, 1881)

Synonyms
- Ephestia humeralis Butler, 1881; Homoeosoma humeralis

Species of moth

Unadilla humeralis is a moth of the family Pyralidae described by Arthur Gardiner Butler in 1881. It is endemic to the Hawaiian islands of Kauai, Oahu, Molokai and Hawaii.

The larvae feed on Ageratum conyzoides, Bidens, Dahlia and marigold. They feed in the flower heads of their host plant and also bore in the stems.
