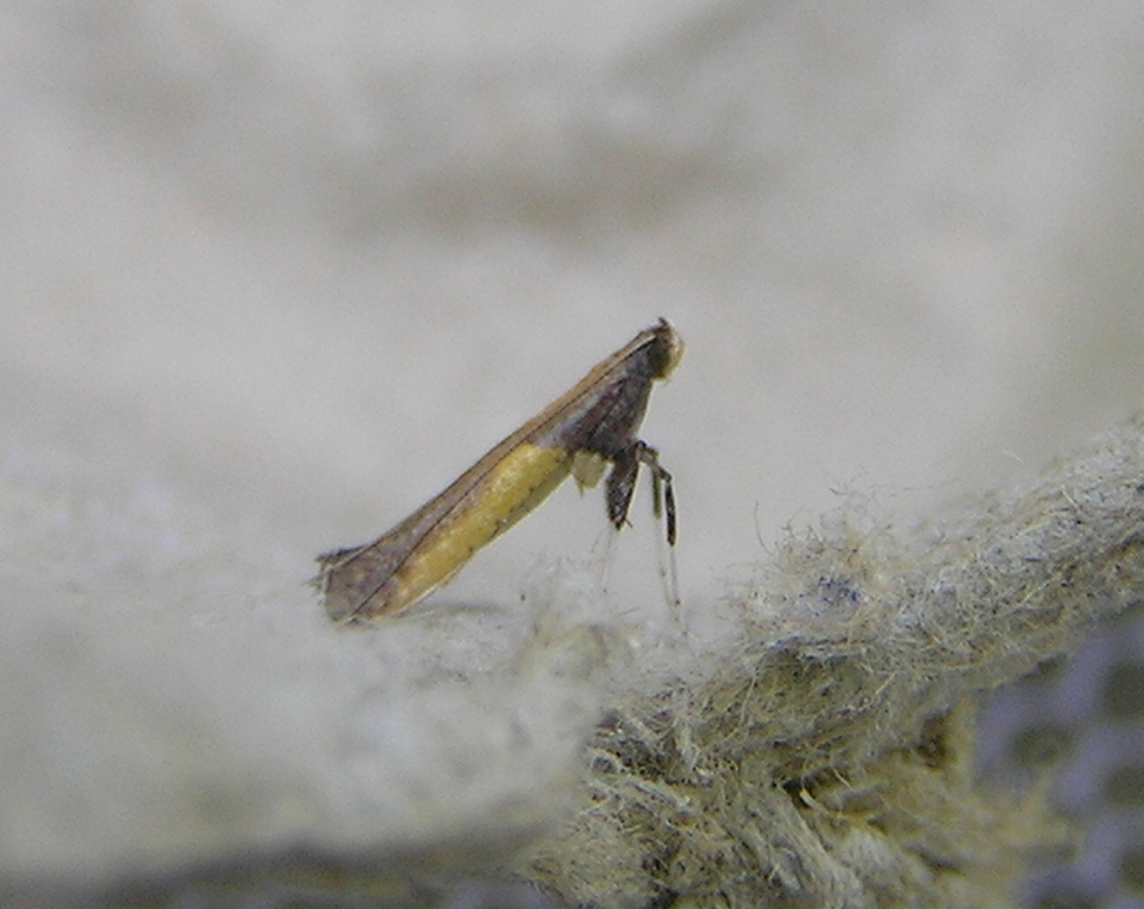

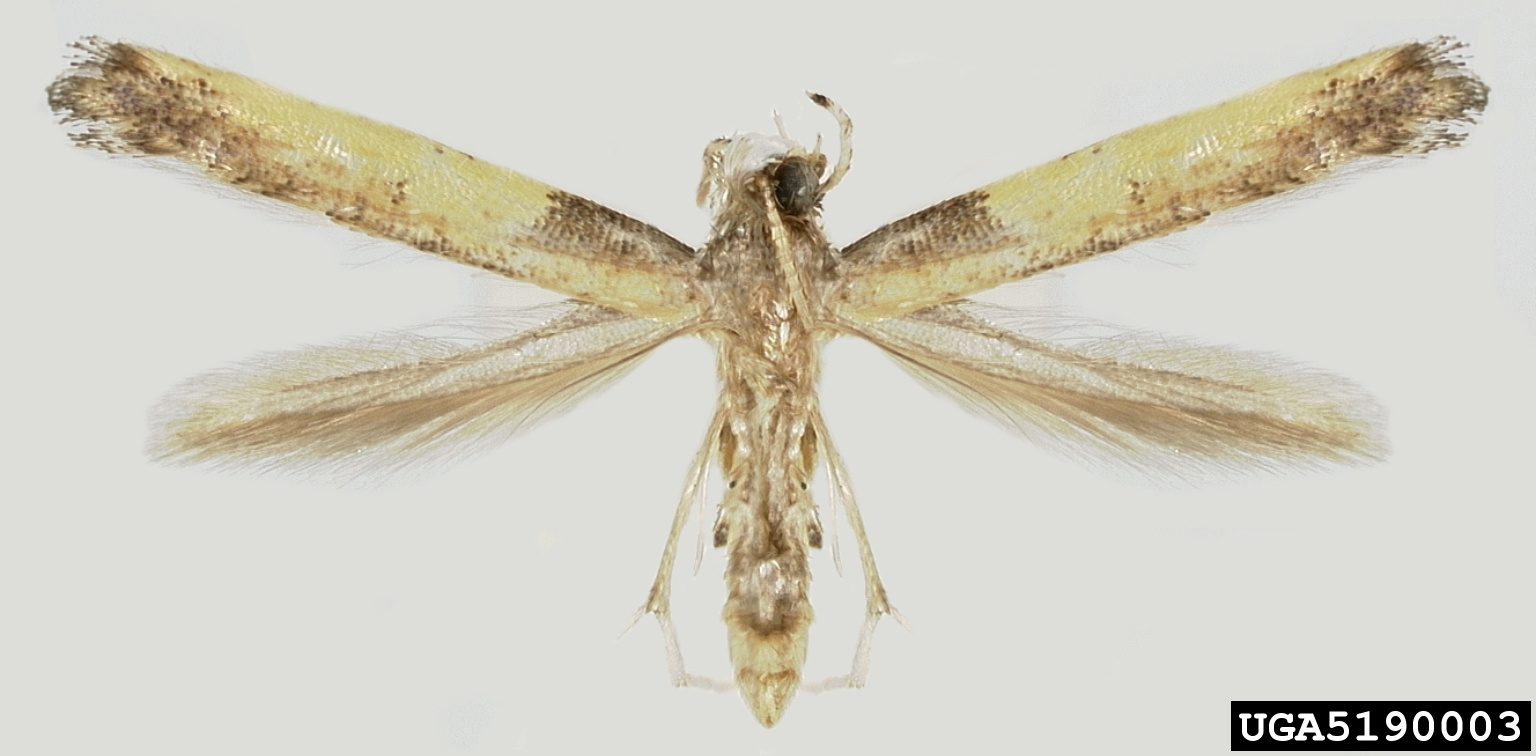

Scientific classification
- Kingdom: Animalia
- Phylum: Arthropoda
- Clade: Pancrustacea
- Class: Insecta
- Order: Lepidoptera
- Family: Gracillariidae
- Genus: Caloptilia
- Species: C. azaleella

Binomial name
- Caloptilia azaleella (Brants, 1913)

Synonyms
- Gracilaria azaleella Brants, 1913; Caloptilia anthracosperma (Meyrick, 1931); Gracilaria azaleae Busck, 1914; Caloptilia azaleae (Busck, 1914)

= Caloptilia azaleella =

Azalea leaf miner

Species of moth

Caloptilia azaleella (azalea leaf miner) is a moth of the family Gracillariidae. It is endemic to Japan, but has been introduced worldwide, wherever there are Azaleas.

== Distribution ==
Initially described in the Netherlands from plants imported from Japan, it is found throughout Europe and has also been introduced in New Zealand and eastern Australia. In the southern part of Britain it occurs in sheltered gardens including Buckingham Palace, the Royal Botanic Gardens, Kew and the Royal Horticultural Society Gardens, Wisley. It has been widely reported in greenhouses. In the United States the species can be found from Florida to Texas, and as far north as Long Island, West Virginia, and the Ohio Valley. On the west Coast it is found in California, Washington and British Columbia, Canada.

== Description ==
The type locality is Boskoop, Netherlands, and was described in 1913, from moths reared on Azalea indica, a cultivar of Rhododendron indicum, that was imported from Japan. The moths forewings are mainly dark brown with a yellow band along the costal margin. The wingspan is 10–11 millimetres (0.39–0.43 in) and it flies from May to October depending on the location and in Britain is double-brooded and sometimes there is a partial third brood.

== Ecology ==
Caloptilia azaleella deposits its eggs on azalea (Rhododendron spp) plants, under leaves near the midrib. These are the only hosts so far recorded. The larva initially forms a mine and later rolls the leaf downwards from the tip, forming a cone. When mature a pale-brown pupa is formed in a white, membranous silken cocoon spun beneath a leaf and the moths can mate a week later.
