= Panaphelix =

Scientific classification
- Domain: Eukaryota
- Kingdom: Animalia
- Phylum: Arthropoda
- Class: Insecta
- Order: Lepidoptera
- Family: Tortricidae
- Tribe: Archipini
- Genus: Panaphelix; Walsingham, 1907

Genus of tortrix moths

Panaphelix is a genus of moths belonging to the subfamily Tortricinae of the family Tortricidae.

== Species ==
- Panaphelix asteliana Swezey, 1932
- Panaphelix kikokea Austin & Rubinoff, 2024
- Panaphelix marmorata Walsingham, 1907
- Panaphelix mapala Austin & Rubinoff, 2024
- Panaphelix nalowale Austin & Rubinoff, 2024

== See also ==
- List of Tortricidae genera
