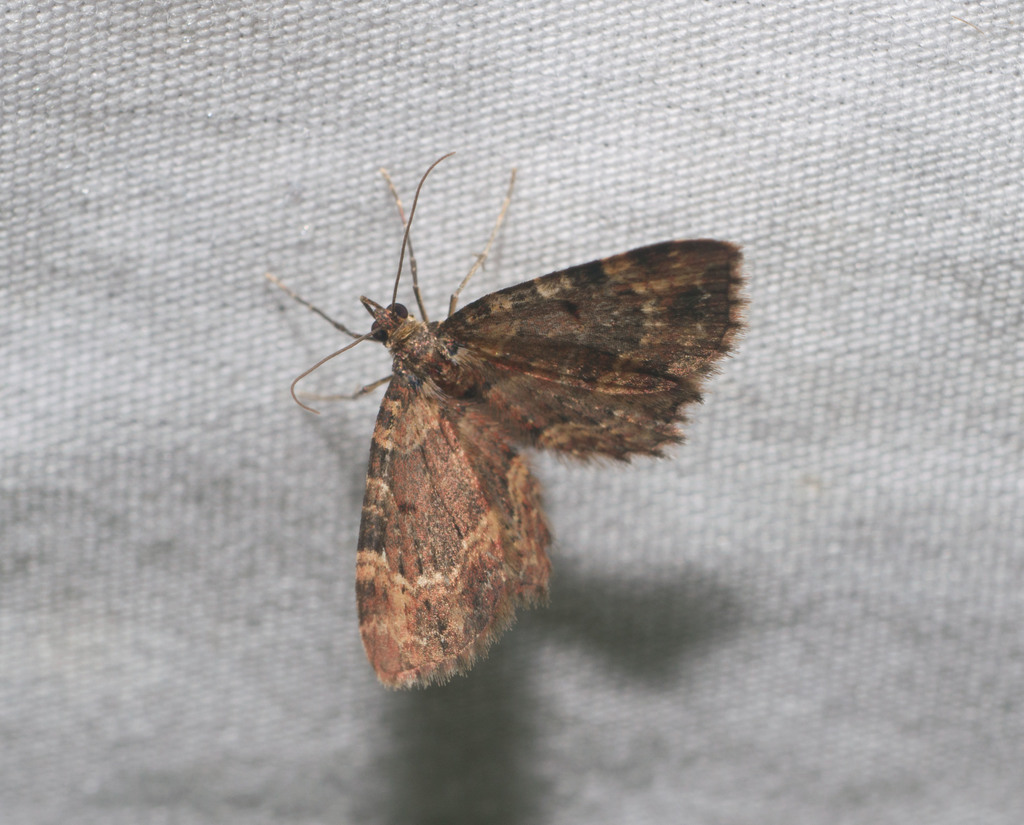

Scientific classification
- Kingdom: Animalia
- Phylum: Arthropoda
- Clade: Pancrustacea
- Class: Insecta
- Order: Lepidoptera
- Family: Geometridae
- Genus: Eupithecia
- Species: E. staurophragma

Binomial name
- Eupithecia staurophragma (Meyrick, 1899)

Synonyms
- Eucymatoge staurophragma Meyrick, 1899

= Eupithecia staurophragma =

Species of moth

Eupithecia staurophragma is a moth of the family Geometridae. It was first described by Edward Meyrick in 1899. It is endemic to the Hawaiian islands of Maui and Hawaii.
