= Udea constricta =

Scientific classification
- Domain: Eukaryota
- Kingdom: Animalia
- Phylum: Arthropoda
- Class: Insecta
- Order: Lepidoptera
- Family: Crambidae
- Genus: Udea
- Species: U. constricta

Binomial name
- Udea constricta (Butler, 1882)

Synonyms
- Scopula constricta Butler, 1882; Oeobia constricta; Protocolletis constricta; Pyrausta constricta

Species of moth

Udea constricta is a moth of the family Crambidae. It is endemic to the Hawaiian islands of Kauai, Oahu and Molokai.

The larvae feed on Scaevola species, including Scaevola chamissoniana, Scaevola gaudichaudii and Scaevola mollis.
