= Eupithecia dryinombra =

Scientific classification
- Kingdom: Animalia
- Phylum: Arthropoda
- Class: Insecta
- Order: Lepidoptera
- Family: Geometridae
- Genus: Eupithecia
- Species: E. dryinombra

Binomial name
- Eupithecia dryinombra (Meyrick, 1899)

Synonyms
- Eucymatoge dryinombra Meyrick, 1899

Species of moth

Eupithecia dryinombra is a moth of the family Geometridae. It was first described by Edward Meyrick in 1899. It is endemic to the Hawaiian islands of Molokai and Hawaii.
