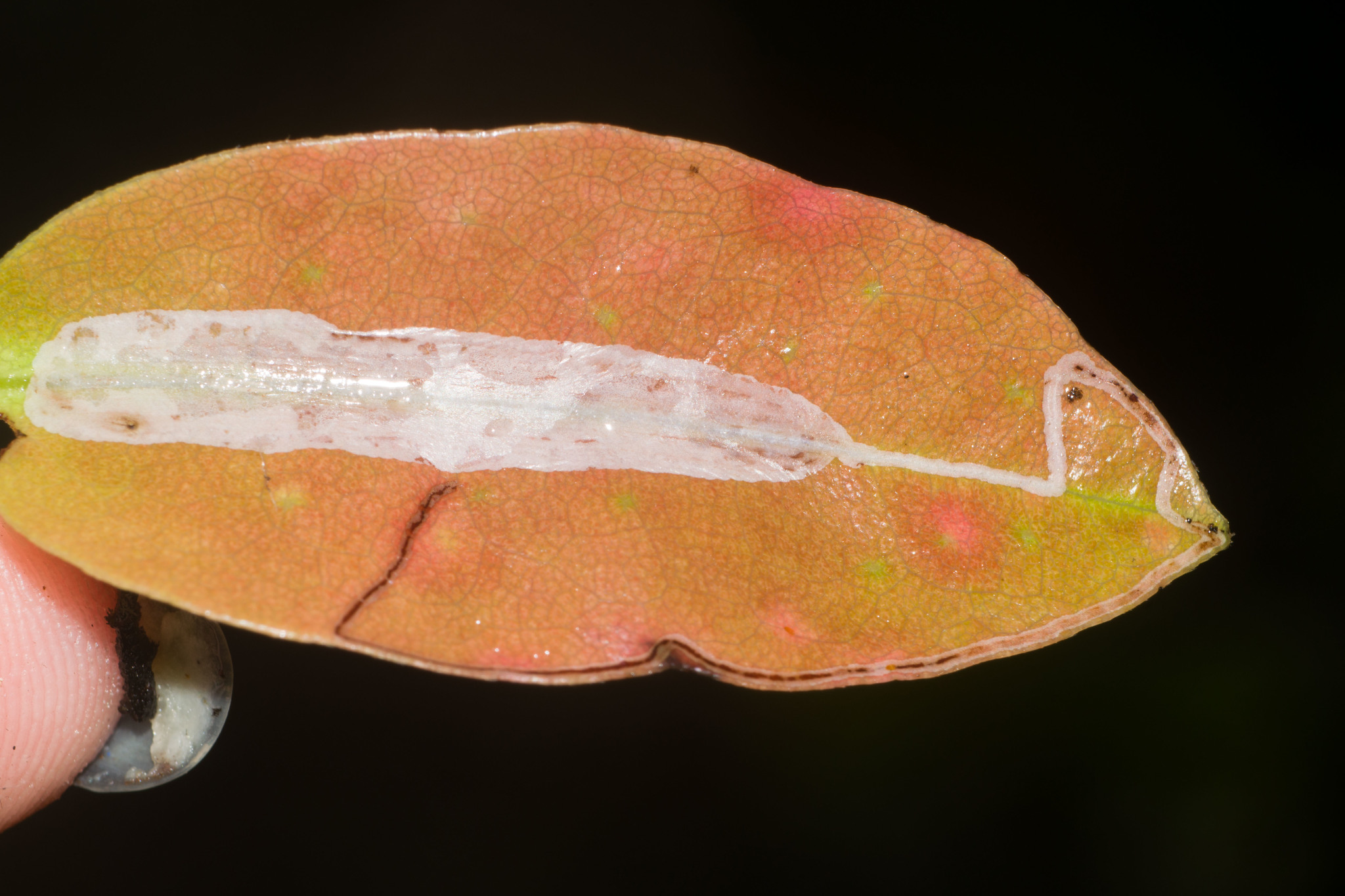
- Leaf mine on Diospyros sandwicensis

Scientific classification
- Domain: Eukaryota
- Kingdom: Animalia
- Phylum: Arthropoda
- Class: Insecta
- Order: Lepidoptera
- Family: Gracillariidae
- Genus: Caloptilia
- Species: C. mabaella

Binomial name
- Caloptilia mabaella (Swezey, 1910)

Synonyms
- Gracilaria mabaella Swezey, 1910; Caloptilia mabella (Meyrick, 1912)

= Caloptilia mabaella =

Hawaiian ebony leaf miner

Species of moth

Caloptilia mabaella, the Hawaiian ebony leaf miner, is a moth of the family Gracillariidae. It was first described by Otto Herman Swezey in 1910. It is only known from the Hawaiian island of Oahu in the United States.

The larvae feed on Diospyros sandwicensis, Diospyros hillebrandii. They mine the leaves of their host plant.
