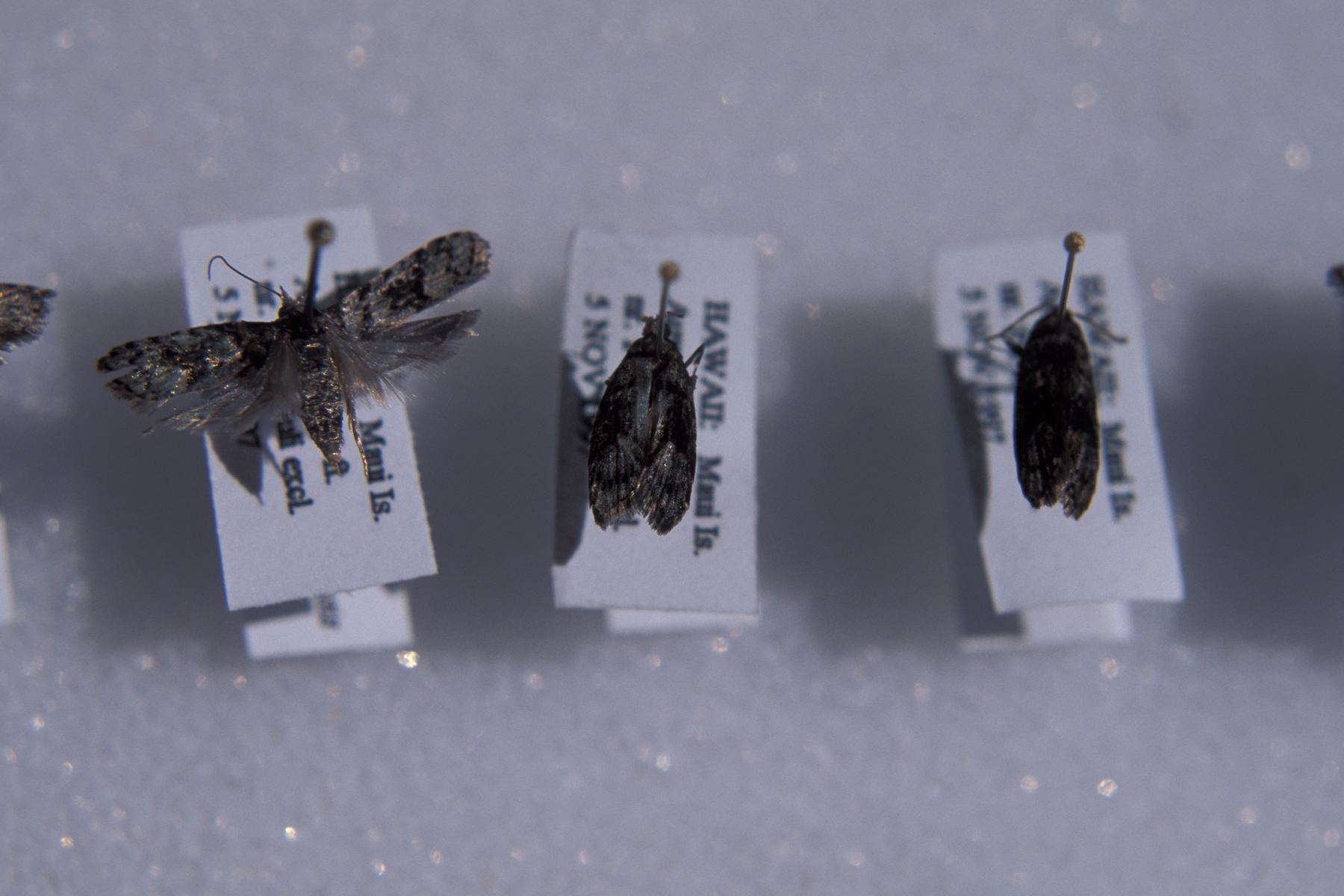

Scientific classification
- Kingdom: Animalia
- Phylum: Arthropoda
- Clade: Pancrustacea
- Class: Insecta
- Order: Lepidoptera
- Family: Carposinidae
- Genus: Carposina
- Species: C. nigronotata

Binomial name
- Carposina nigronotata (Walsingham, 1907)

Synonyms
- Heterocrossa nigronotata Walsingham, 1907

= Carposina nigronotata =

Species of moth

Carposina nigronotata is a moth of the family Carposinidae. It was first described by Lord Walsingham in 1907. It is endemic to the Hawaiian islands of Maui and Hawaii.

The larvae feed in fruit and seeds of Myrsine lessertiana.
