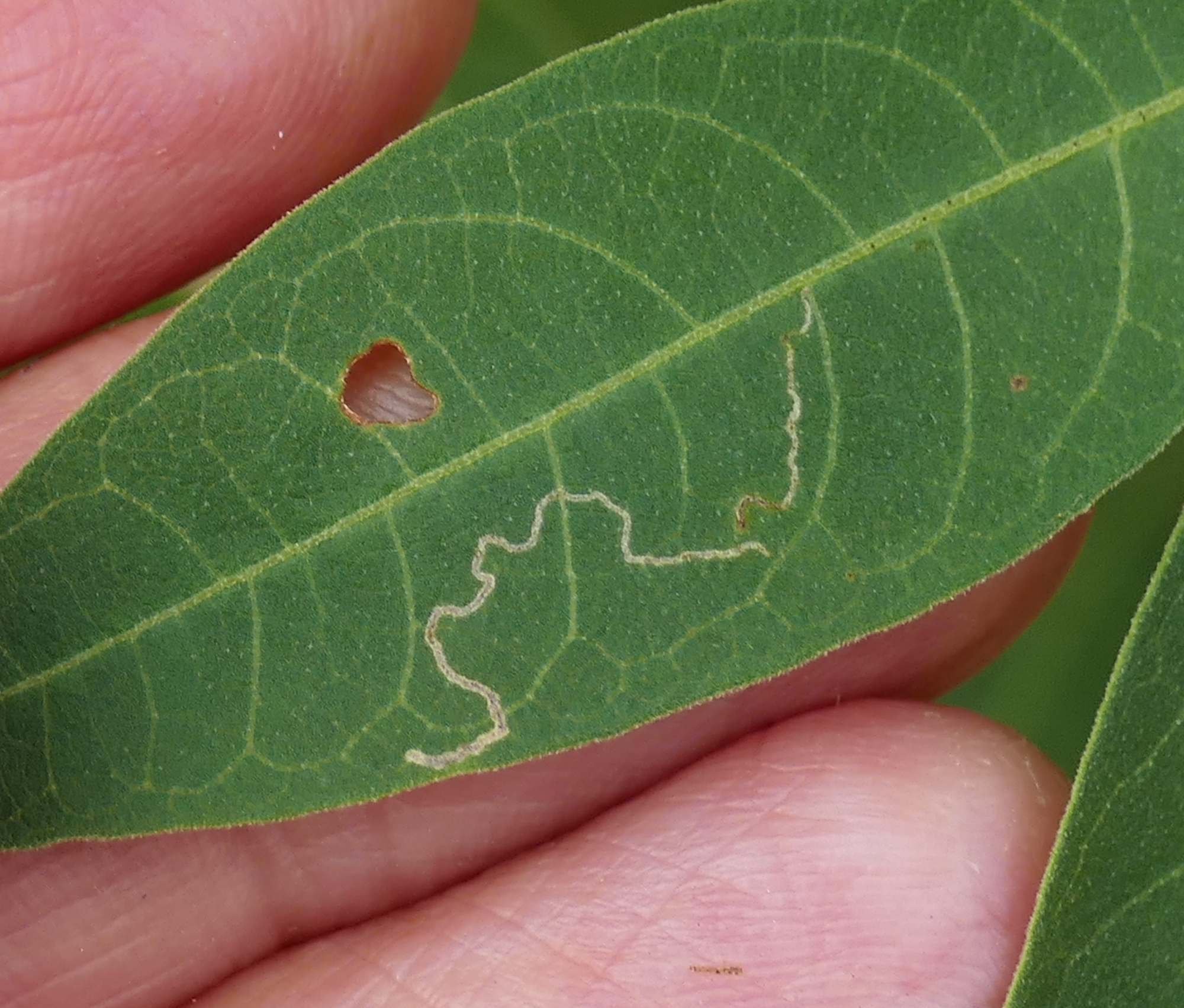
- on Gossypium thurberi

Scientific classification
- Kingdom: Animalia
- Phylum: Arthropoda
- Clade: Pancrustacea
- Class: Insecta
- Order: Lepidoptera
- Family: Bucculatricidae
- Genus: Bucculatrix
- Species: B. thurberiella

Binomial name
- Bucculatrix thurberiella Busck, 1914

= Bucculatrix thurberiella =

Species of moth

Bucculatrix thurberiella, the cotton leaf perforator, is a species of moth of the family Bucculatricidae. It was first described by August Busck in 1914. It is native to the south-western United States and northern Mexico. It is an introduced species in Hawaii.

The wingspan is 7–9 mm.

The larvae feed on Gossypium tomentosum and Thurberia thespesioides. They mine the leaves of their host plant.
