= Eudonia jucunda =

Scientific classification
- Kingdom: Animalia
- Phylum: Arthropoda
- Class: Insecta
- Order: Lepidoptera
- Family: Crambidae
- Genus: Eudonia
- Species: E. jucunda

Binomial name
- Eudonia jucunda (Butler, 1881)

Synonyms
- Scoparia jucunda Butler, 1881; Xeroscopa jucunda

Species of moth

Eudonia jucunda is a moth of the family Crambidae. It is endemic to the Hawaiian islands of Oahu, Lanai and Hawaii.
