= Eudonia isophaea =

Scientific classification
- Kingdom: Animalia
- Phylum: Arthropoda
- Class: Insecta
- Order: Lepidoptera
- Family: Crambidae
- Genus: Eudonia
- Species: E. isophaea

Binomial name
- Eudonia isophaea (Meyrick, 1904)

Synonyms
- Scoparia isophaea Meyrick, 1904; Scoparia isoplaca Klima, 1937

Species of moth

Eudonia isophaea is a moth of the family Crambidae. It is endemic to the Hawaiian island of Molokai.
