= Eudonia ombrodes =

Scientific classification
- Kingdom: Animalia
- Phylum: Arthropoda
- Class: Insecta
- Order: Lepidoptera
- Family: Crambidae
- Genus: Eudonia
- Species: E. ombrodes

Binomial name
- Eudonia ombrodes (Meyrick, 1888)

Synonyms
- Xeroscopa ombrodes Meyrick, 1888; Scoparia ombrodes; Scoparia catactis Meyrick, 1904

Species of moth

Eudonia ombrodes is a moth of the family Crambidae. It is endemic to the Hawaiian islands of Oahu, Molokai, Maui, Lanai and Hawaii.

== Subspecies ==
- Eudonia ombrodes ombrodes (Oahu, Molokai, Maui, Lanai, Hawaii)
- Eudonia ombrodes perkinsi Zimmerman, 1958 (Oahu, Molokai, Lanai, Hawaii)
