= Progonostola cremnopis =

Scientific classification
- Kingdom: Animalia
- Phylum: Arthropoda
- Class: Insecta
- Order: Lepidoptera
- Family: Geometridae
- Genus: Progonostola
- Species: P. cremnopis

Binomial name
- Progonostola cremnopis Meyrick, 1899

Species of moth

Progonostola cremnopis is a moth of the family Geometridae. It was first described by Edward Meyrick in 1899. It is endemic to the Hawaiian islands of Kauai, Oahu, Molokai and Hawaii.

The description of Robert Cyril Layton Perkins (1913) reads: "Near Honolulu it may be found resting on tree-trunks or the stems of tree-ferns on Mt. Tantalus, and on the decomposed lava of steep cliffs at Nuuanu Pali."
