= Lophoplusia psectrocera =

Scientific classification
- Kingdom: Animalia
- Phylum: Arthropoda
- Class: Insecta
- Order: Lepidoptera
- Superfamily: Noctuoidea
- Family: Noctuidae
- Genus: Lophoplusia
- Species: L. psectrocera

Binomial name
- Lophoplusia psectrocera (Hampson, 1913)

Synonyms
- Phytometra psectrocera Hampson, 1913

Species of moth

Lophoplusia psectrocera is a moth of the family Noctuidae. It was first described by George Hampson in 1913. It is endemic to the Hawaiian island of Maui.
