= Progonostola =

Scientific classification
- Kingdom: Animalia
- Phylum: Arthropoda
- Class: Insecta
- Order: Lepidoptera
- Family: Geometridae
- Subfamily: Larentiinae
- Genus: Progonostola; Meyrick, 1899

Genus of moths

Progonostola is a genus of moths in the family Geometridae, native to Hawaii.

== Species ==
- Progonostola caustoscia Meyrick, 1899
- Progonostola cremnopis Meyrick, 1899
