= Eudonia pachysema =

Scientific classification
- Kingdom: Animalia
- Phylum: Arthropoda
- Class: Insecta
- Order: Lepidoptera
- Family: Crambidae
- Genus: Eudonia
- Species: E. pachysema

Binomial name
- Eudonia pachysema (Meyrick, 1888)

Synonyms
- Xeroscopa pachysema Meyrick, 1888; Scoparia pachysema

Species of moth

Eudonia pachysema is a moth of the family Crambidae. It is endemic to the Hawaiian island of Maui.
