= Cydia plicatum =

Scientific classification
- Kingdom: Animalia
- Phylum: Arthropoda
- Class: Insecta
- Order: Lepidoptera
- Family: Tortricidae
- Genus: Cydia
- Species: C. plicatum

Binomial name
- Cydia plicatum (Walsingham in Sharp, 1907)

Synonyms
- Cydia plicata; Adenoneura plicatum Walsingham, 1907

Species of moth

Cydia plicatum is a moth of the family Tortricidae. It was first described by Lord Walsingham in 1907. It is endemic to the Hawaiian islands of Maui and Hawaii.

The larvae feed on the seeds of Sophora chrysophylla.

The enigmatic moth described as Cydia obliqua might simply be a variant of C. plicata; the same applies to the even rarer (and feared extinct) C. storeella.
