= Udea phyllostegia =

Scientific classification
- Domain: Eukaryota
- Kingdom: Animalia
- Phylum: Arthropoda
- Class: Insecta
- Order: Lepidoptera
- Family: Crambidae
- Genus: Udea
- Species: U. phyllostegia

Binomial name
- Udea phyllostegia (Swezey, 1946)

Synonyms
- Phlyctaenia phyllostegia Swezey, 1946; Oeobia phyllostegia

Species of moth

Udea phyllostegia is a moth of the family Crambidae. It is endemic to the Hawaiian island of Oahu.

The larvae feed on Phyllostegia species.
