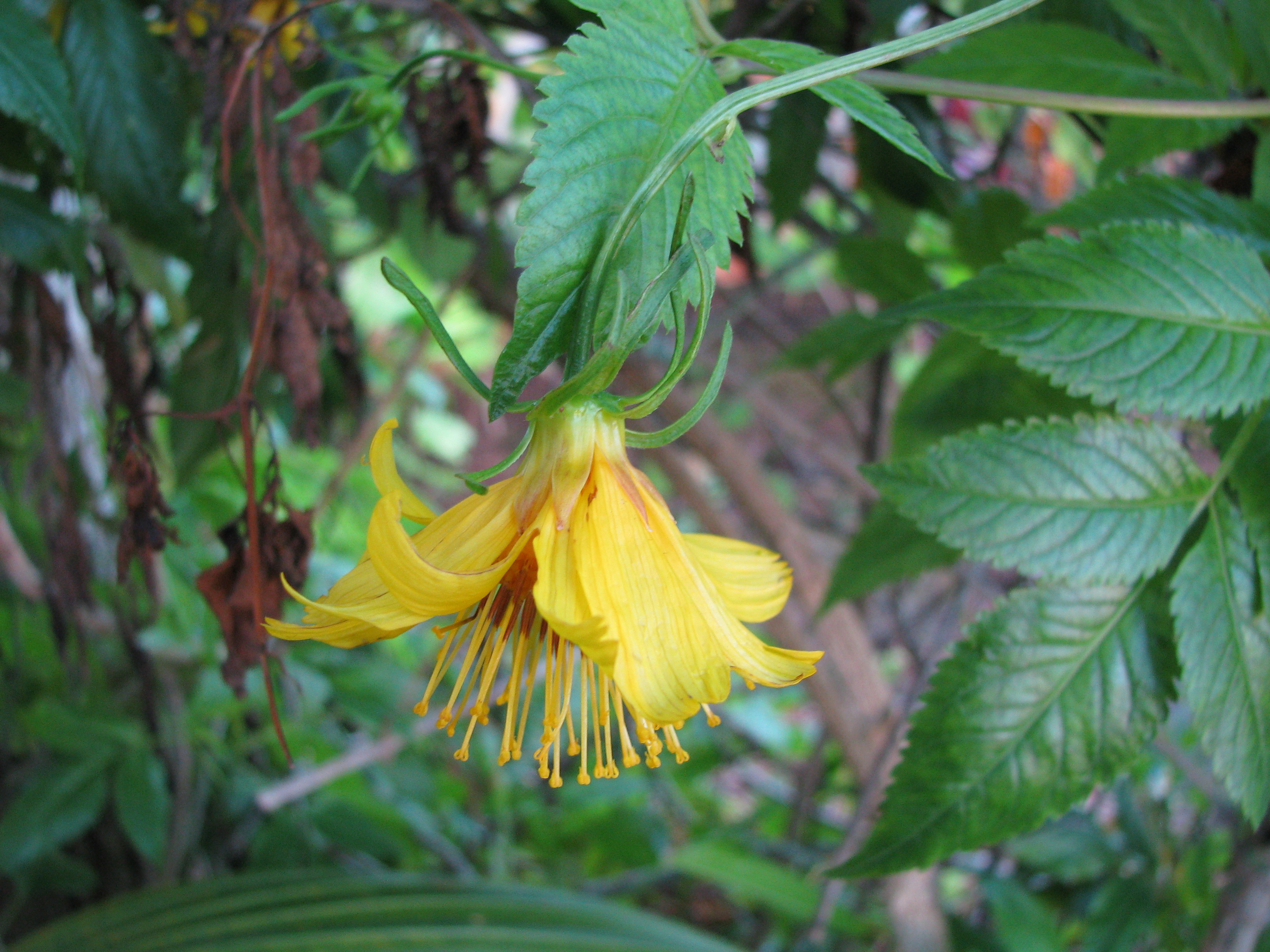

Conservation status
- Endangered (IUCN 3.1)

Scientific classification
- Kingdom: Plantae
- Clade: Tracheophytes
- Clade: Angiosperms
- Clade: Eudicots
- Clade: Asterids
- Order: Asterales
- Family: Asteraceae
- Genus: Bidens
- Species: B. cosmoides

Binomial name
- Bidens cosmoides (A.Gray) Sherff

Synonyms
- Coreopsis cosmoides A.Gray; Bidens cosmoides var. refracta Hochr.; Bidens dimidiata O.Deg. & Sherff; Campylotheca cosmoides (A.Gray) Hillebr.

= Bidens cosmoides =

Species of flowering plant

Bidens cosmoides, commonly known as the cosmosflower beggarticks, is a species of flowering plant in the sunflower family. It is endemic to mixed mesic forests at elevations of 2,000–3,000 ft (610–910 m) on the island of Kauaʻi in Hawaii. This particular member of the genus Bidens is far larger than its relatives and is pollinated by birds.

Unlike its smaller relatives, collectively called kokoʻolau or koʻokoʻolau in the Hawaiian language, B. cosmoides is so conspicuous and distinct that it was given a distinct name by the locals: poʻola nui ("grand poʻola"). This refers to the fact that the leaves and habitus of B. cosmoides somewhat resemble the poʻola (Claoxylon sandwicense) but unlike that plant, poʻola nui bears spectacular yellow flowers.

This plant is found only along the island's Mohihi Trail. It is threatened by habitat loss due to the spread of invasive weeds and brushfires. It has also been adversely affected by the disappearance of Hawaiian honeycreeper species that pollinate it.
