= Omiodes asaphombra =

Conservation status
- Vulnerable (IUCN 3.1)

Scientific classification
- Kingdom: Animalia
- Phylum: Arthropoda
- Class: Insecta
- Order: Lepidoptera
- Family: Crambidae
- Genus: Omiodes
- Species: O. asaphombra

Binomial name
- Omiodes asaphombra Meyrick, 1899

Synonyms
- Hedylepta asaphrombra (Meyrick, 1899); Nacoleia asaphombra; Phostria asaphombra; Nacoleia hemiombra Hampson, 1912; Phostria hemiombra

Species of moth

Omiodes asaphombra, sometimes called the ʻohe hedyleptan moth, is a species of moth in the family Pyralidae endemic to Hawaiʻi. It was listed as possibly extinct by the United States Fish and Wildlife Service, and as extinct by the IUCN and the Hawaii Biological Survey.

This species has historically been collected on the islands of Kauaʻi, Oʻahu, Molokaʻi, and Hawaiʻi. This species has only been reared from Joinvillea adscendens, and although it has been reported to be specific to this plant, it is likely that O. asaphombra is able to utilize another host plant. The larvae web together the upper leaves of the host plant and feed upon them before they become expanded.

== See also ==
- Joinvilleaceae
