= Omiodes anastrepta =

Scientific classification
- Kingdom: Animalia
- Phylum: Arthropoda
- Class: Insecta
- Order: Lepidoptera
- Family: Crambidae
- Genus: Omiodes
- Species: O. anastrepta

Binomial name
- Omiodes anastrepta Meyrick, 1899

Synonyms
- Hedylepta anastrepta; Nacoleia anastrepta; Phostria anastrepta

Species of moth

Omiodes anastrepta is a moth of the family Crambidae. It is endemic to the Hawaiian islands of Oahu, Molokai and Hawaii. It was first cited as possibly extinct in 1994 by the U.S. Fish & Wildlife Service. It was listed as extinct by the Hawaiʻi Biological Survey in 2002, but was rediscovered in 2003.

The larvae feed on Carex wahuensis.
