= Omiodes decisalis =

Scientific classification
- Kingdom: Animalia
- Phylum: Arthropoda
- Class: Insecta
- Order: Lepidoptera
- Family: Crambidae
- Genus: Omiodes
- Species: O. decisalis

Binomial name
- Omiodes decisalis (Walker, 1866)

Synonyms
- Botys decisalis Walker, 1866; Hedylepta okinawaensis Yoshiyasu, 1975

Species of moth

Omiodes decisalis is a moth in the family Crambidae. It was described by Francis Walker in 1866. It is found in Indonesia (Java), Japan, China and Australia.
