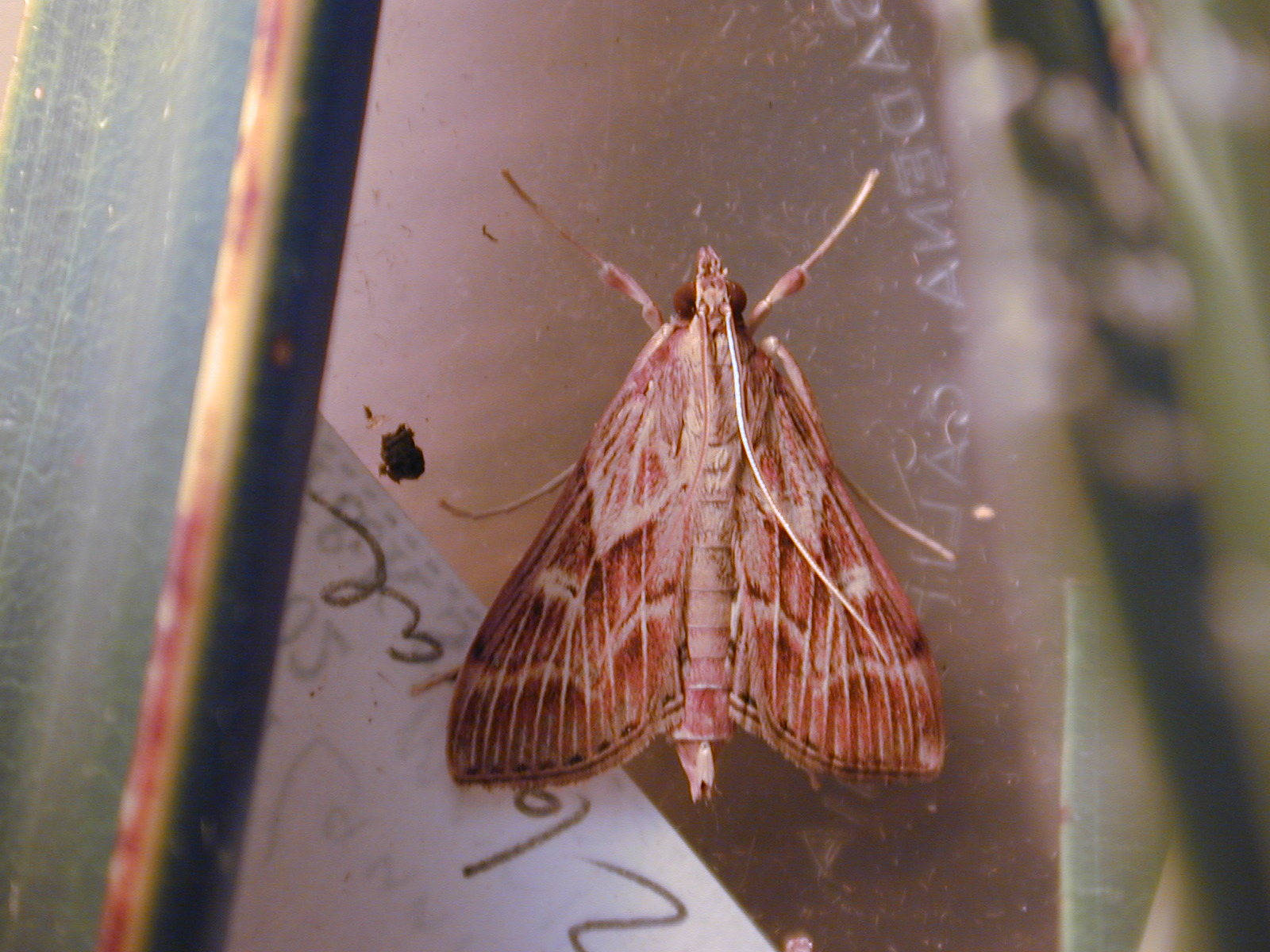
- Coconut leafroller (Omiodes blackburni)

Scientific classification
- Kingdom: Animalia
- Phylum: Arthropoda
- Clade: Pancrustacea
- Class: Insecta
- Order: Lepidoptera
- Family: Crambidae
- Tribe: Margaroniini
- Genus: Omiodes; Guenée, 1854

Synonyms
- Charema Moore, 1888; Coenostola Lederer, 1863; Coenolesta Whalley, 1962; Deba Walker, 1866; Hedylepta Lederer, 1863; Hedilepta Lederer, 1863; Lonchodes Guenée, 1854; Loxocreon Warren, 1892; Merotoma Meyrick, 1894; Pelecyntis Meyrick, 1884; Phycidicera Snellen, 1880; Spargeta Lederer, 1863

= Omiodes =

Genus of moths

Omiodes is a moth genus in the family Crambidae (which is sometimes included in the Pyralidae). Several species are endemic to Hawaii.

== Species ==
- Omiodes accepta (Butler, 1877)
- Omiodes albicilialis (Schaus, 1912)
- Omiodes albicinctalis (Hampson, 1904)
- Omiodes alboanalis Amsel, 1956
- Omiodes albociliata (Moore, 1888)
- Omiodes analis Snellen, 1880
- Omiodes anastrepta Meyrick, 1899
- Omiodes anastreptoidis Swezey, 1913
- Omiodes annubilata (Swinhoe, 1894)
- Omiodes antidoxa Meyrick, 1904
- Omiodes anxiferalis (Schaus, 1912)
- Omiodes argentigulalis (Schaus, 1912)
- Omiodes asaphombra Meyrick, 1899 – ʻohe hedyleptan moth
- Omiodes barcalis (Walker, 1859)
- Omiodes basalticalis (Lederer, 1863)
- Omiodes blackburni (Butler, 1877) – coconut leafroller
- Omiodes camphorae (Tams, 1928)
- Omiodes capillalis (Guenée, 1854)
- Omiodes chloromochla (Meyrick, 1936)
- Omiodes chrysampyx (Turner, 1908)
- Omiodes collinsi Whalley, 1962
- Omiodes confusalis (Dognin, 1905)
- Omiodes continuatalis (Wallengren, 1860)
- Omiodes contubernalis (Moore, 1888)
- Omiodes croceiceps (Walker, 1866)
- Omiodes cuniculalis Guenée, 1854
- Omiodes dairalis (Walker, 1859)
- Omiodes decisalis (Walker, 1866)
- Omiodes demaratalis (Walker, 1859) – Hawaiian grass leafroller
- Omiodes diemenalis (Guenée, 1854)
- Omiodes dispilotalis (Walker, 1866)
- Omiodes epicentra Meyrick, 1899 – Oahu swamp hedyleptan moth
- Omiodes euryprora Meyrick, 1899 – Olaʻa banana hedyleptan moth
- Omiodes fuliginalis (Walker, 1866)
- Omiodes fullawayi Swezey, 1913 – Fullaway's banana hedyleptan moth
- Omiodes fulvicauda (Hampson, 1898)
- Omiodes fuscipennis (Swinhoe, 1894)
- Omiodes giffardi Swezey, 1921
- Omiodes grandis (Druce, 1902)
- Omiodes granulata (Warren, 1896)
- Omiodes hallwachsae Gentili & Solis, 1998
- Omiodes humeralis Guenée, 1854
- Omiodes hypoxantha (Dognin, 1904)
- Omiodes indicata (Fabricius, 1775)
- Omiodes indistincta (Warren, 1892)
- Omiodes insolutalis Möschler, 1890
- Omiodes iridias Meyrick, 1899
- Omiodes janzeni Gentili & Solis, 1998
- Omiodes laysanensis Swezey, 1914 – Laysan hedyleptan moth
- Omiodes lentalis (C. Felder, R. Felder & Rogenhofer, 1875)
- Omiodes leucostrepta Meyrick, 1886
- Omiodes localis (Butler, 1879)
- Omiodes longipennis (Warren, 1896)
- Omiodes maia (Swezey, 1909)
- Omiodes marmarca (Ghesquière, 1942)
- Omiodes martini Amsel, 1956
- Omiodes martyralis (Lederer, 1863)
- Omiodes metricalis (Möschler, 1881)
- Omiodes meyricki (Swinhoe, 1907)
- Omiodes meyrickii Swezey, 1907 – Meyrick's banana hedyleptan moth
- Omiodes monogona Meyrick, 1888
- Omiodes monogramma Meyrick, 1899
- Omiodes mostella (Dyar, 1912)
- Omiodes musicola Swezey, 1909 – Maui banana hedyleptan moth
- Omiodes nigriscripta Warren, 1896
- Omiodes niphoessa (Ghesquière, 1942)
- Omiodes nipponalis Yamanaka, 2005
- Omiodes nitida (Hampson, 1912)
- Omiodes noctescens (Moore, 1888)
- Omiodes ochracea Gentili & Solis, 1998
- Omiodes oconnori Tams, 1935
- Omiodes odontosticta (Hampson, 1899)
- Omiodes origoalis (Walker, 1859)
- Omiodes ovenalis Swinhoe, 1906
- Omiodes pandaralis (Walker, 1859)
- Omiodes pernitescens (Swinhoe, 1894)
- Omiodes poeonalis (Walker, 1859)
- Omiodes poliochroa (Hampson, 1917)
- Omiodes pritchardii Swezey, 1948
- Omiodes pseudocuniculalis Gentili & Solis, 2000
- Omiodes pyraustalis (Strand, 1918)
- Omiodes rufescens (Hampson, 1912)
- Omiodes salebrialis (Snellen, 1880)
- Omiodes sauterialis (Strand, 1918)
- Omiodes scotaea (Hampson, 1912)
- Omiodes seminitidalis (Schaus, 1912)
- Omiodes simialis Guenée, 1854
- Omiodes similis (Moore, 1885)
- Omiodes sirena Gentili & Solis, 1998
- Omiodes spoliatalis (Lederer, 1863)
- Omiodes stigmosalis (Warren, 1892)
- Omiodes surrectalis (Walker, 1866)
- Omiodes telegrapha Meyrick, 1899 – telegraphic hedyleptan moth
- Omiodes tristrialis (Bremer, 1864)
- Omiodes trizonalis (E. Hering, 1901)
- Omiodes xanthodysana (Dyar, 1914)
- Omiodes maculicostalis (Hampson, 1893)

== Former species ==
- Omiodes imbecilis (Moore, 1888)
- Omiodes palliventralis Snellen, 1890
