= Omiodes martyralis =

Scientific classification
- Domain: Eukaryota
- Kingdom: Animalia
- Phylum: Arthropoda
- Class: Insecta
- Order: Lepidoptera
- Family: Crambidae
- Genus: Omiodes
- Species: O. martyralis

Binomial name
- Omiodes martyralis (Lederer, 1863)

Synonyms
- Coenostola martyralis Lederer, 1863; Hedylepta vulpina Meyrick, 1936; Omiodes cervinalis Amsel, 1956

Species of moth

Omiodes martyralis is a moth in the family Crambidae. It was described by Julius Lederer in 1863. It is found in Argentina, Venezuela, Brazil, Puerto Rico, Costa Rica and Mexico.
