= Omiodes analis =

Scientific classification
- Kingdom: Animalia
- Phylum: Arthropoda
- Class: Insecta
- Order: Lepidoptera
- Family: Crambidae
- Genus: Omiodes
- Species: O. analis

Binomial name
- Omiodes analis Snellen, 1880

Synonyms
- Phryganodes analis; Charema albociliate Moore 1888; Omiodes hiracia Meyrick, 1894; Phostria analis (Snellen, 1880)

Species of moth

Omiodes analis is a moth in the family Crambidae. It was described by Snellen in 1880. It is found in India, China, Borneo and Taiwan.
