= Omiodes metricalis =

Scientific classification
- Domain: Eukaryota
- Kingdom: Animalia
- Phylum: Arthropoda
- Class: Insecta
- Order: Lepidoptera
- Family: Crambidae
- Genus: Omiodes
- Species: O. metricalis

Binomial name
- Omiodes metricalis (Möschler, 1881)

Synonyms
- Botis metricalis Möschler, 1881

Species of moth

Omiodes metricalis is a moth in the family Crambidae. It was described by Heinrich Benno Möschler in 1881. It is found in Suriname.
