= Omiodes anxiferalis =

Scientific classification
- Domain: Eukaryota
- Kingdom: Animalia
- Phylum: Arthropoda
- Class: Insecta
- Order: Lepidoptera
- Family: Crambidae
- Genus: Omiodes
- Species: O. anxiferalis

Binomial name
- Omiodes anxiferalis (Schaus, 1912)

Synonyms
- Phryganodes anxiferalis Schaus, 1912

Species of moth

Omiodes anxiferalis is a moth in the family Crambidae. It was described by Schaus in 1912. It is found in Costa Rica.
