= Omiodes hypoxantha =

Scientific classification
- Domain: Eukaryota
- Kingdom: Animalia
- Phylum: Arthropoda
- Class: Insecta
- Order: Lepidoptera
- Family: Crambidae
- Genus: Omiodes
- Species: O. hypoxantha

Binomial name
- Omiodes hypoxantha (Dognin, 1904)

Synonyms
- Phryganodes hypoxantha Dognin, 1904

Species of moth

Omiodes hypoxantha is a moth in the family Crambidae. It was described by Paul Dognin in 1904. It is found in Ecuador.
