= Omiodes nigriscripta =

Scientific classification
- Domain: Eukaryota
- Kingdom: Animalia
- Phylum: Arthropoda
- Class: Insecta
- Order: Lepidoptera
- Family: Crambidae
- Genus: Omiodes
- Species: O. nigriscripta

Binomial name
- Omiodes nigriscripta Warren, 1896

Synonyms
- Phryganodes assimilis Rothschild, 1915; Phryganodes fuscicilia Hampson, 1912; Phryganodes rufior Strand, 1917

Species of moth

Omiodes nigriscripta is a moth in the family Crambidae. It was described by Warren in 1896. It is found in Papua New Guinea and Australia.
