= Maui banana hedyleptan moth =

Conservation status
- Endangered (IUCN 3.1)

Scientific classification
- Kingdom: Animalia
- Phylum: Arthropoda
- Class: Insecta
- Order: Lepidoptera
- Family: Crambidae
- Genus: Omiodes
- Species: O. musicola

Binomial name
- Omiodes musicola Swezey, 1909

Synonyms
- Hedylepta musicola Swezey, 1909; Phostria musicola

Species of moth

The Maui banana hedyleptan moth (Omiodes musicola) is a species of moth in the family Crambidae. It was described by Otto Herman Swezey in 1909 and is endemic to the Hawaiian islands of Molokai and Maui.

The larvae feed on banana. Full-grown larvae are about 27 mm long and dull pale green.

The pupa is 14 mm long and medium brown. The pupal stage takes about 11 days.
