= Omiodes accepta =

Scientific classification
- Domain: Eukaryota
- Kingdom: Animalia
- Phylum: Arthropoda
- Class: Insecta
- Order: Lepidoptera
- Family: Crambidae
- Genus: Omiodes
- Species: O. accepta

Binomial name
- Omiodes accepta (Butler, 1877)

Synonyms
- Hedylepta accepta; Botys accepta Butler, 1877; Nacoleia accepta; Phostria accepta; Lamprosema accepta

Species of moth

Omiodes accepta, the sugarcane leafroller, is a moth of the family Crambidae. It is endemic to the Hawaiian islands of Kauai, Oahu, Molokai, Maui and Hawaii.

The larvae feed on various grasses, including Digitaria prurient, Oplismenus compositus, Pampas grass, Panicum nephehphilum, Paspalum conjugatum, Paspalum orbiculare, sugarcane and the sedge Baumea meyenii.
