= Omiodes alboanalis =

Scientific classification
- Kingdom: Animalia
- Phylum: Arthropoda
- Clade: Pancrustacea
- Class: Insecta
- Order: Lepidoptera
- Family: Crambidae
- Genus: Omiodes
- Species: O. alboanalis

Binomial name
- Omiodes alboanalis Amsel, 1956

Species of moth

Omiodes alboanalis is a moth in the family Crambidae. It was described by Hans Georg Amsel in 1956. It is found in Venezuela, Argentina, Brazil, and Costa Rica.
