= Omiodes insolutalis =

Scientific classification
- Domain: Eukaryota
- Kingdom: Animalia
- Phylum: Arthropoda
- Class: Insecta
- Order: Lepidoptera
- Family: Crambidae
- Genus: Omiodes
- Species: O. insolutalis

Binomial name
- Omiodes insolutalis Möschler, 1890

Species of moth

Omiodes insolutalis is a moth in the family Crambidae. It was described by Heinrich Benno Möschler in 1890. It is found in Puerto Rico and Costa Rica.
