= Omiodes pandaralis =

Scientific classification
- Kingdom: Animalia
- Phylum: Arthropoda
- Class: Insecta
- Order: Lepidoptera
- Family: Crambidae
- Genus: Omiodes
- Species: O. pandaralis

Binomial name
- Omiodes pandaralis (Walker, 1859)

Synonyms
- Botys pandaralis Walker, 1859; Botys ochrosoma C. Felder, R. Felder & Rogenhofer, 1875; Phryganodes gazalis Schaus, 1912

Species of moth

Omiodes pandaralis is a moth in the family Crambidae. It was described by Francis Walker in 1859. It is found in Brazil and Costa Rica.
