= Omiodes antidoxa =

Scientific classification
- Kingdom: Animalia
- Phylum: Arthropoda
- Class: Insecta
- Order: Lepidoptera
- Family: Crambidae
- Genus: Omiodes
- Species: O. antidoxa

Binomial name
- Omiodes antidoxa Meyrick, 1904

Synonyms
- Hedylepta antidoxa; Phostria antidoxa

Species of moth

Omiodes antidoxa is a moth of the family Crambidae. It is endemic to the Hawaiian islands of Kauai and Oahu.

The larvae feed on Carex oahuensis and Rhynchospora thyrsoidea. Full-grown larvae are bright green.
