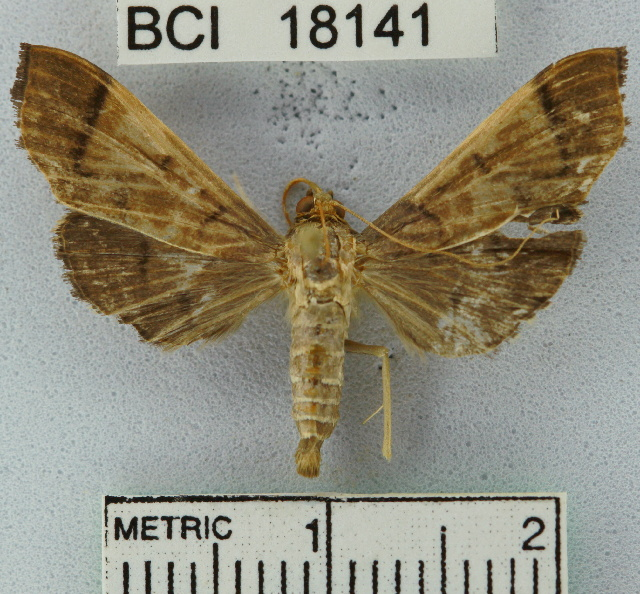

Scientific classification
- Domain: Eukaryota
- Kingdom: Animalia
- Phylum: Arthropoda
- Class: Insecta
- Order: Lepidoptera
- Family: Crambidae
- Genus: Omiodes
- Species: O. confusalis

Binomial name
- Omiodes confusalis (Dognin, 1905)

Synonyms
- Coenostola confusalis Dognin, 1905; Nacoleia lenticurvalis Hampson, 1912; Phostria duplicata Kaye, 1923; Phryganodes anchoritalis Dyar, 1914

= Omiodes confusalis =

Species of moth

Omiodes confusalis is a moth in the family Crambidae. It was described by Paul Dognin in 1905. It is found in Ecuador, Venezuela, Trinidad, Mexico, Panama and Costa Rica.
