= Omiodes dispilotalis =

Scientific classification
- Kingdom: Animalia
- Phylum: Arthropoda
- Class: Insecta
- Order: Lepidoptera
- Family: Crambidae
- Genus: Omiodes
- Species: O. dispilotalis

Binomial name
- Omiodes dispilotalis (Walker, 1866)

Synonyms
- Analtes dispilotalis Walker, 1866; Coenostola pallicostalis Snellen, 1880; Conogethes lictor Meyrick, 1887

Species of moth

Omiodes dispilotalis is a moth in the family Crambidae. It was described by Francis Walker in 1866. It is found in Indonesia (Sulawesi, Sula) and Australia, where it has been recorded from Queensland.

Adults are brown with a pale yellow area along each the forewing costa.
