= Omiodes cuniculalis =

Scientific classification
- Kingdom: Animalia
- Phylum: Arthropoda
- Class: Insecta
- Order: Lepidoptera
- Family: Crambidae
- Genus: Omiodes
- Species: O. cuniculalis

Binomial name
- Omiodes cuniculalis Guenée, 1854

Synonyms
- Omiodes leporalis Guenée, 1854

Species of moth

Omiodes cuniculalis is a moth in the family Crambidae. It was described by Achille Guenée in 1854. It is found in French Guiana, Brazil, Costa Rica and Cuba.

The larvae have been recorded feeding on Gliricidia sepium.
