= Omiodes salebrialis =

Scientific classification
- Kingdom: Animalia
- Phylum: Arthropoda
- Class: Insecta
- Order: Lepidoptera
- Family: Crambidae
- Genus: Omiodes
- Species: O. salebrialis

Binomial name
- Omiodes salebrialis (Snellen, 1880)

Synonyms
- Phycidicera salebrialis Snellen, 1880

Species of moth

Omiodes salebrialis is a moth in the family Crambidae. It was described by Snellen in 1880. It is found in Indonesia (Sulawesi).
