= Omiodes albicinctalis =

Scientific classification
- Kingdom: Animalia
- Phylum: Arthropoda
- Class: Insecta
- Order: Lepidoptera
- Family: Crambidae
- Genus: Omiodes
- Species: O. albicinctalis

Binomial name
- Omiodes albicinctalis (Hampson, 1904)

Synonyms
- Nacoleia albicinctalis Hampson, 1904

Species of moth

Omiodes albicinctalis is a moth in the family Crambidae. It was described by George Hampson in 1904. It is found on the Bahamas.
