= Omiodes rufescens =

Scientific classification
- Kingdom: Animalia
- Phylum: Arthropoda
- Class: Insecta
- Order: Lepidoptera
- Family: Crambidae
- Genus: Omiodes
- Species: O. rufescens

Binomial name
- Omiodes rufescens (Hampson, 1912)

Synonyms
- Pilocrocis rufescens Hampson, 1912; Sylepta miamialis Dyar, 1917

Species of moth

Omiodes rufescens is a moth in the family Crambidae. It was described by George Hampson in 1912. It is found in the Bahamas and the United States, where it has been recorded from Florida.

The wingspan is about 25 mm. Adults are on wing nearly year round in Florida.
