= Omiodes pernitescens =

Scientific classification
- Domain: Eukaryota
- Kingdom: Animalia
- Phylum: Arthropoda
- Class: Insecta
- Order: Lepidoptera
- Family: Crambidae
- Genus: Omiodes
- Species: O. pernitescens

Binomial name
- Omiodes pernitescens (C. Swinhoe, 1894)

Synonyms
- Charema pernitescens C. Swinhoe, 1894

Species of moth

Omiodes pernitescens is a moth in the family Crambidae. It was described by Charles Swinhoe in 1894. It is found in Meghalaya, India and China.
