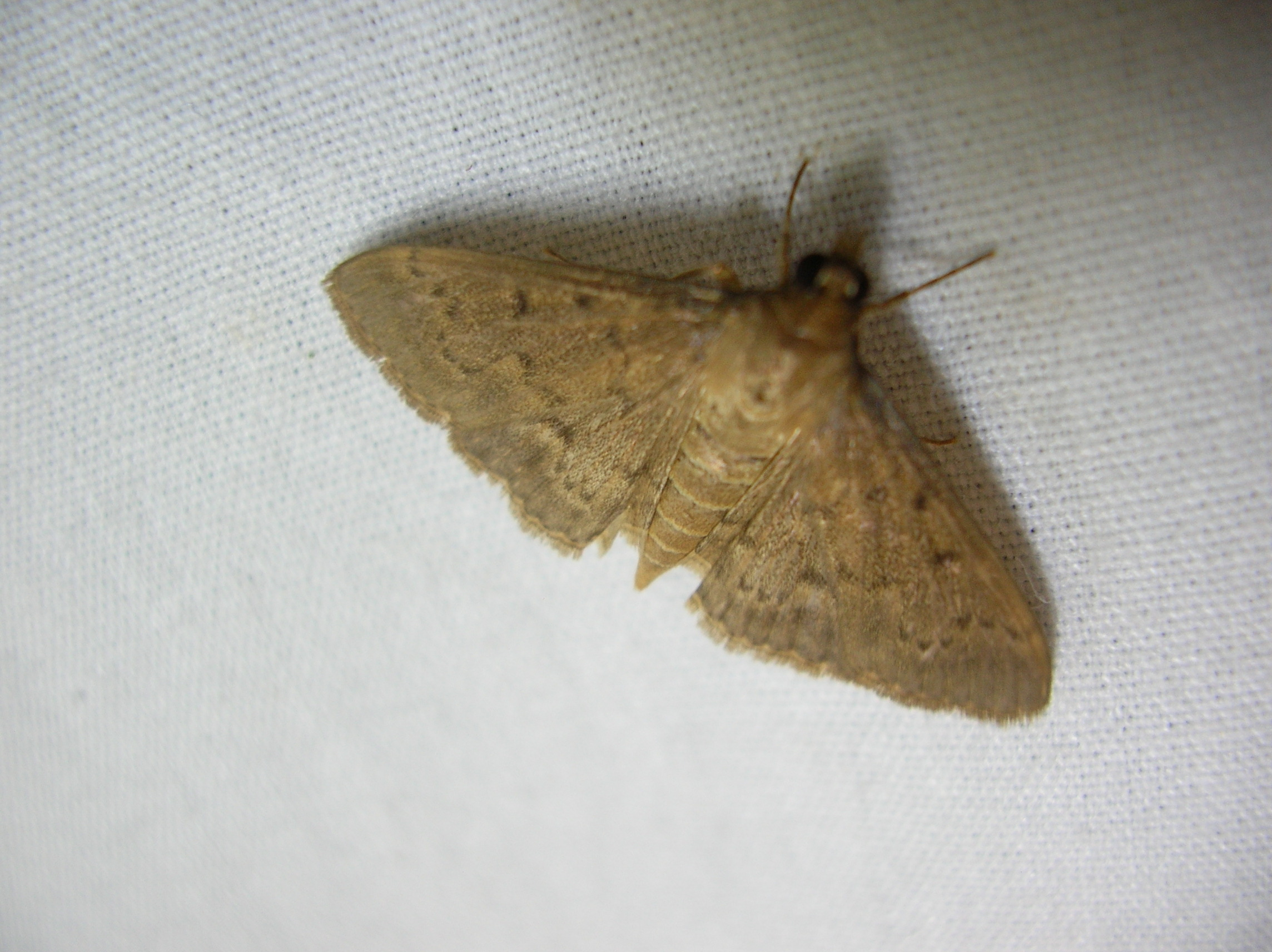

Scientific classification
- Domain: Eukaryota
- Kingdom: Animalia
- Phylum: Arthropoda
- Class: Insecta
- Order: Lepidoptera
- Family: Crambidae
- Genus: Omiodes
- Species: O. localis

Binomial name
- Omiodes localis (Butler, 1879)

Synonyms
- Botys localis Butler, 1879; Hedylepta localis; Nacoleia localis; Phostria localis

= Omiodes localis =

Species of moth

Omiodes localis is a moth of the family Crambidae. It is endemic to the Hawaiian islands of Kauai, Oahu, Molokai, Maui, Lanai and Hawaii.

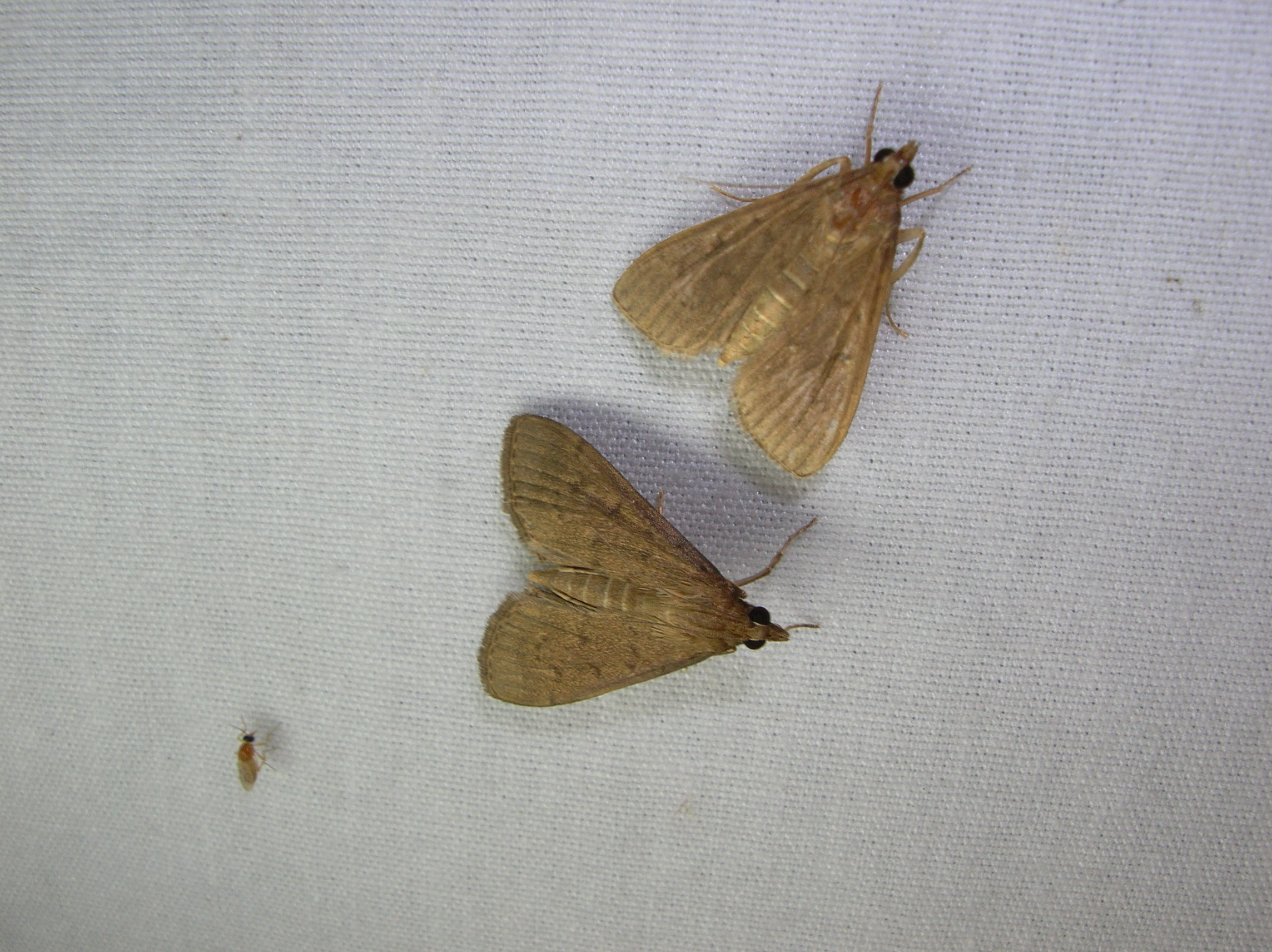

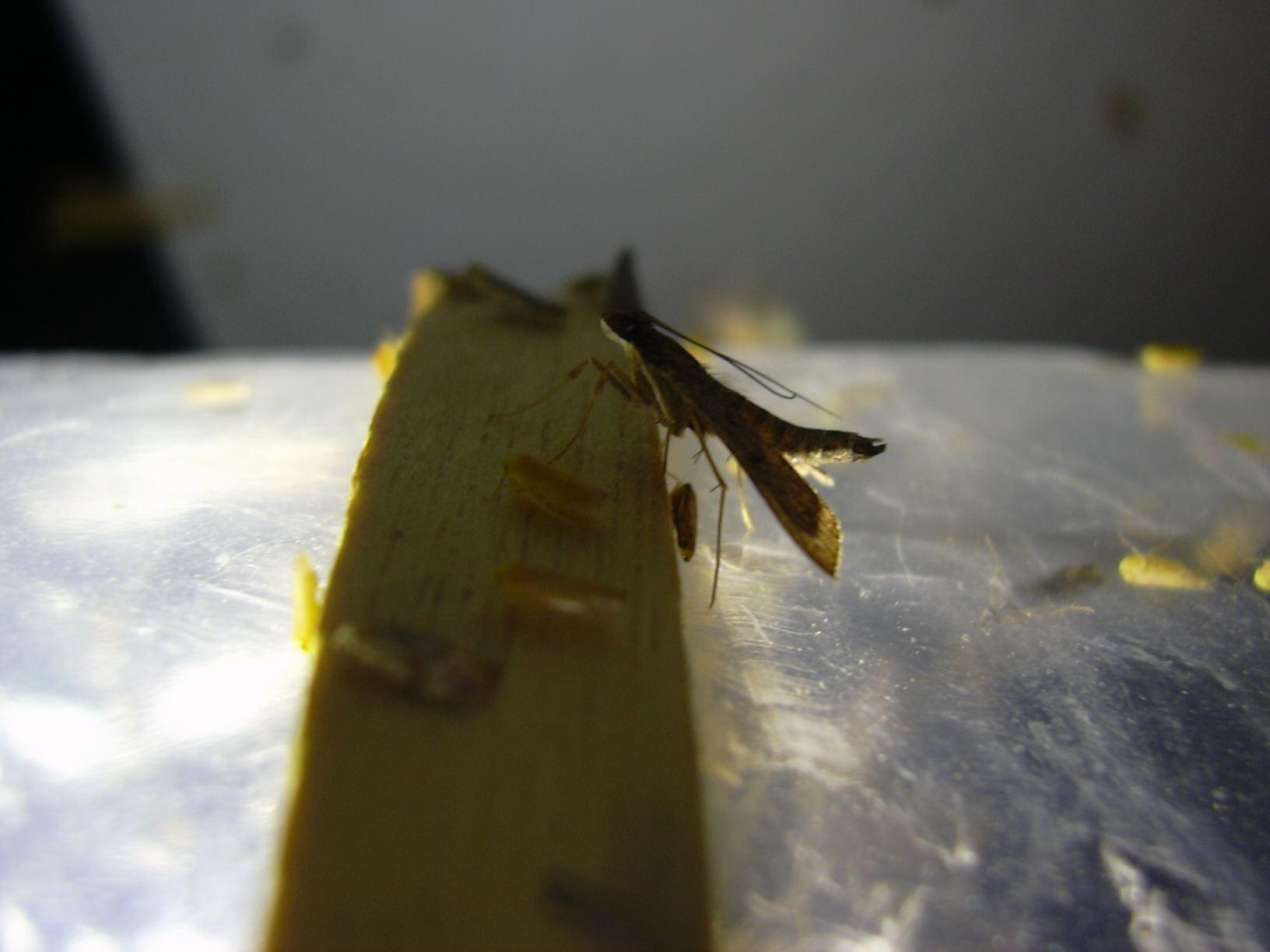

The larvae feed on Digitaria pruriens, Oplismenus compositus, Paspalum conjugatum and occasionally on sugarcane.
