= Omiodes ovenalis =

Scientific classification
- Domain: Eukaryota
- Kingdom: Animalia
- Phylum: Arthropoda
- Class: Insecta
- Order: Lepidoptera
- Family: Crambidae
- Genus: Omiodes
- Species: O. ovenalis

Binomial name
- Omiodes ovenalis C. Swinhoe, 1906

Species of moth

Omiodes ovenalis is a moth in the family Crambidae. It was described by Charles Swinhoe in 1906. It is found on Borneo and the Andaman Islands.
