= Laysan hedyleptan moth =

Conservation status
- Critically Endangered (IUCN 3.1)

- Possibly Extinct (NatureServe)

Scientific classification
- Kingdom: Animalia
- Phylum: Arthropoda
- Clade: Pancrustacea
- Class: Insecta
- Order: Lepidoptera
- Family: Crambidae
- Genus: Omiodes
- Species: O. laysanensis

Binomial name
- Omiodes laysanensis Swezey, 1914

Synonyms
- Hedylepta laysanensis (Swezey, 1914)

Species of moth

The Laysan hedyleptan moth (Omiodes laysanensis), sometimes also known as the Laysan leafroller moth, is a species of moth in the family Crambidae. It is endemic to Laysan in the Northwestern Hawaiian Islands. It was described by American entomologist Otto Herman Swezey in 1914 based on three specimens collected from Laysan in 1912, but has not been recorded since, and may be extinct.
