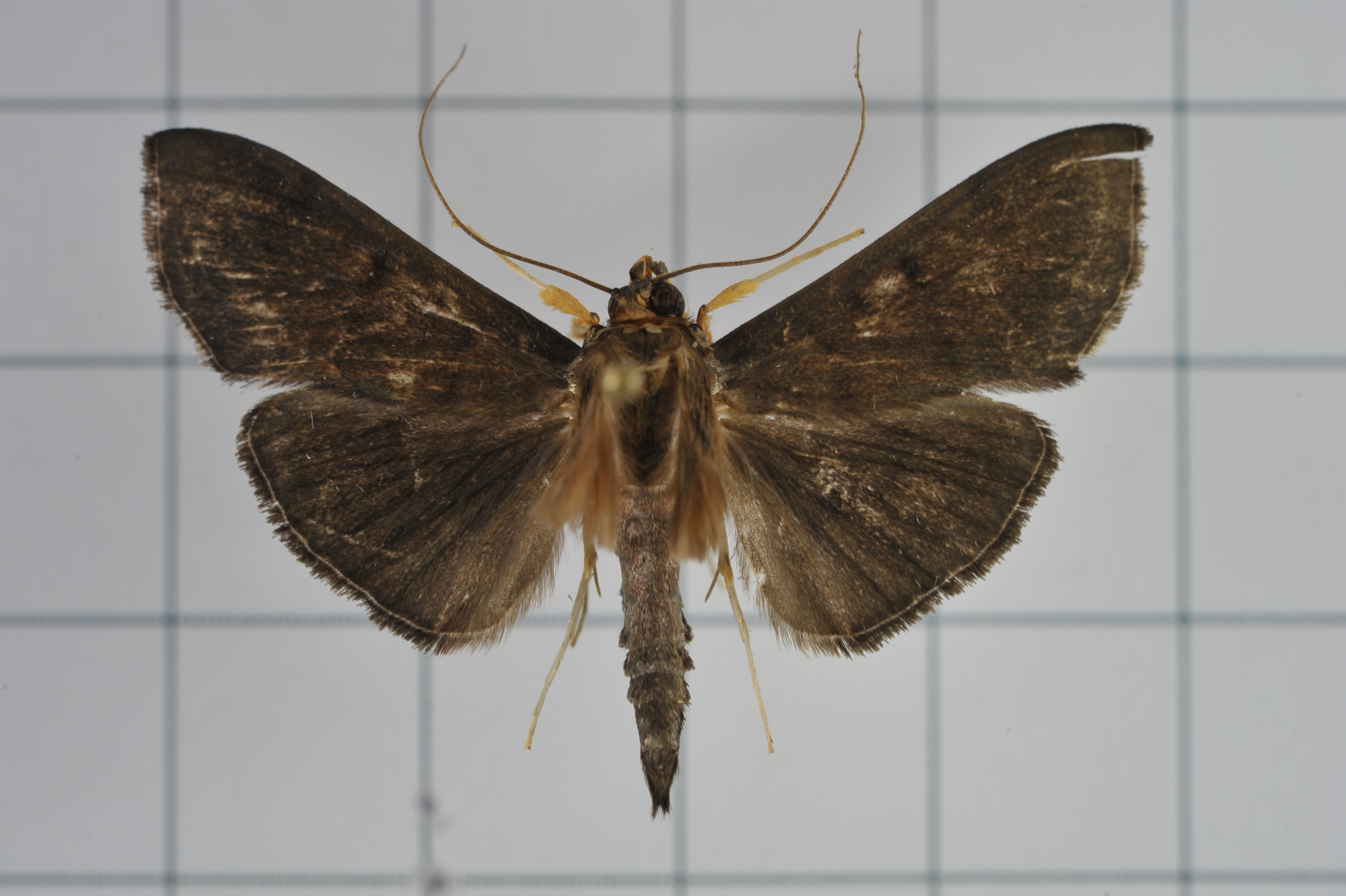

Scientific classification
- Kingdom: Animalia
- Phylum: Arthropoda
- Class: Insecta
- Order: Lepidoptera
- Family: Crambidae
- Genus: Omiodes
- Species: O. noctescens

Binomial name
- Omiodes noctescens (Moore, 1888)

Synonyms
- Charema noctescens Moore, 1888

= Omiodes noctescens =

Species of moth

Omiodes noctescens is a moth in the family Crambidae. It was described by Frederic Moore in 1888. It is found in India, China Korea, Japan and Taiwan.
