= Omiodes annubilata =

Scientific classification
- Domain: Eukaryota
- Kingdom: Animalia
- Phylum: Arthropoda
- Class: Insecta
- Order: Lepidoptera
- Family: Crambidae
- Genus: Omiodes
- Species: O. annubilata

Binomial name
- Omiodes annubilata (C. Swinhoe, 1894)

Synonyms
- Charema annubilata C. Swinhoe, 1894

Species of moth

Omiodes annubilata is a moth in the family Crambidae. It was described by Charles Swinhoe in 1894. It is found in India.
