= Omiodes poliochroa =

Scientific classification
- Kingdom: Animalia
- Phylum: Arthropoda
- Class: Insecta
- Order: Lepidoptera
- Family: Crambidae
- Genus: Omiodes
- Species: O. poliochroa

Binomial name
- Omiodes poliochroa (Hampson, 1917)

Synonyms
- Pilocrocis poliochroa Hampson, 1917

Species of moth

Omiodes poliochroa is a moth in the family Crambidae. It was described by George Hampson in 1917. It is found in Peru.
