= Omiodes capillalis =

Scientific classification
- Kingdom: Animalia
- Phylum: Arthropoda
- Class: Insecta
- Order: Lepidoptera
- Family: Crambidae
- Genus: Omiodes
- Species: O. capillalis

Binomial name
- Omiodes capillalis (Guenée, 1854)

Synonyms
- Lonchodes capillalis Guenée, 1854; Phryganodes productalis Hampson, 1899

Species of moth

Omiodes capillalis is a moth in the family Crambidae. It was described by Achille Guenée in 1854. It is found in French Guiana and Suriname.
