= Omiodes poeonalis =

Scientific classification
- Kingdom: Animalia
- Phylum: Arthropoda
- Class: Insecta
- Order: Lepidoptera
- Family: Crambidae
- Genus: Omiodes
- Species: O. poeonalis

Binomial name
- Omiodes poeonalis (Walker, 1859)

Synonyms
- Botys poeonalis Walker, 1859; Asopia misera Butler, 1879; Botys bianoralis Walker, 1859; Botys halmusalis Walker, 1859; Botys korndoerfferi Snellen, 1880; Botys minoralis Walker, 1866; Botys praeteritalis Walker, 1866

Species of moth

Omiodes poeonalis is a moth in the family Crambidae. It was described by Francis Walker in 1859. It is found in the Democratic Republic of the Congo (North Kivu, Bas Congo, Orientale, East Kasai, Katanga), Sierra Leone, Tanzania, the Chagos Archipelago, China, Indonesia (Borneo, Flores, Java, Sumatra), Sri Lanka, Japan and Australia (Queensland).

The larvae feed on Ipomoea batatas, Cassia species, Glycine max, Senna species and Tephrosia candida.
