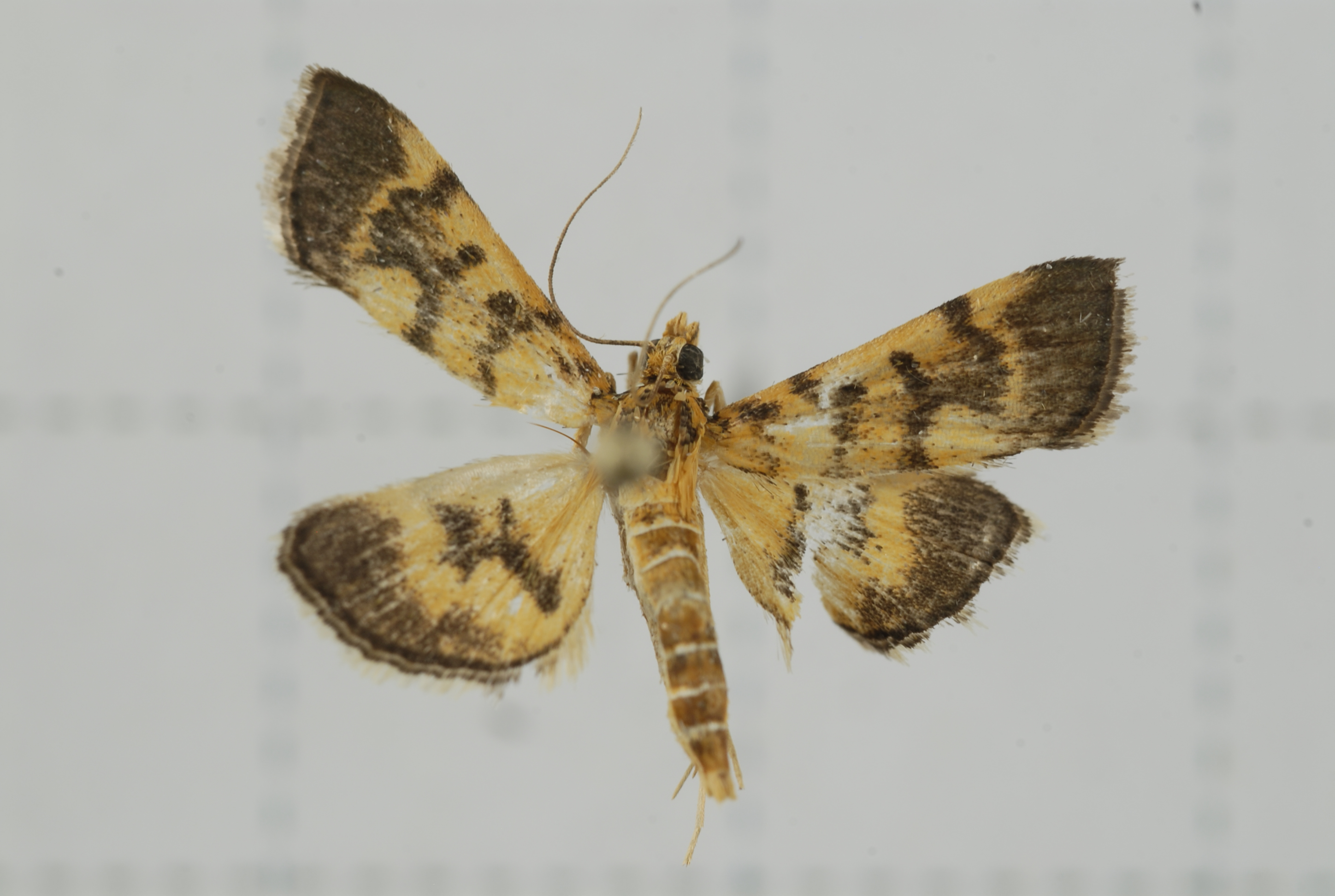

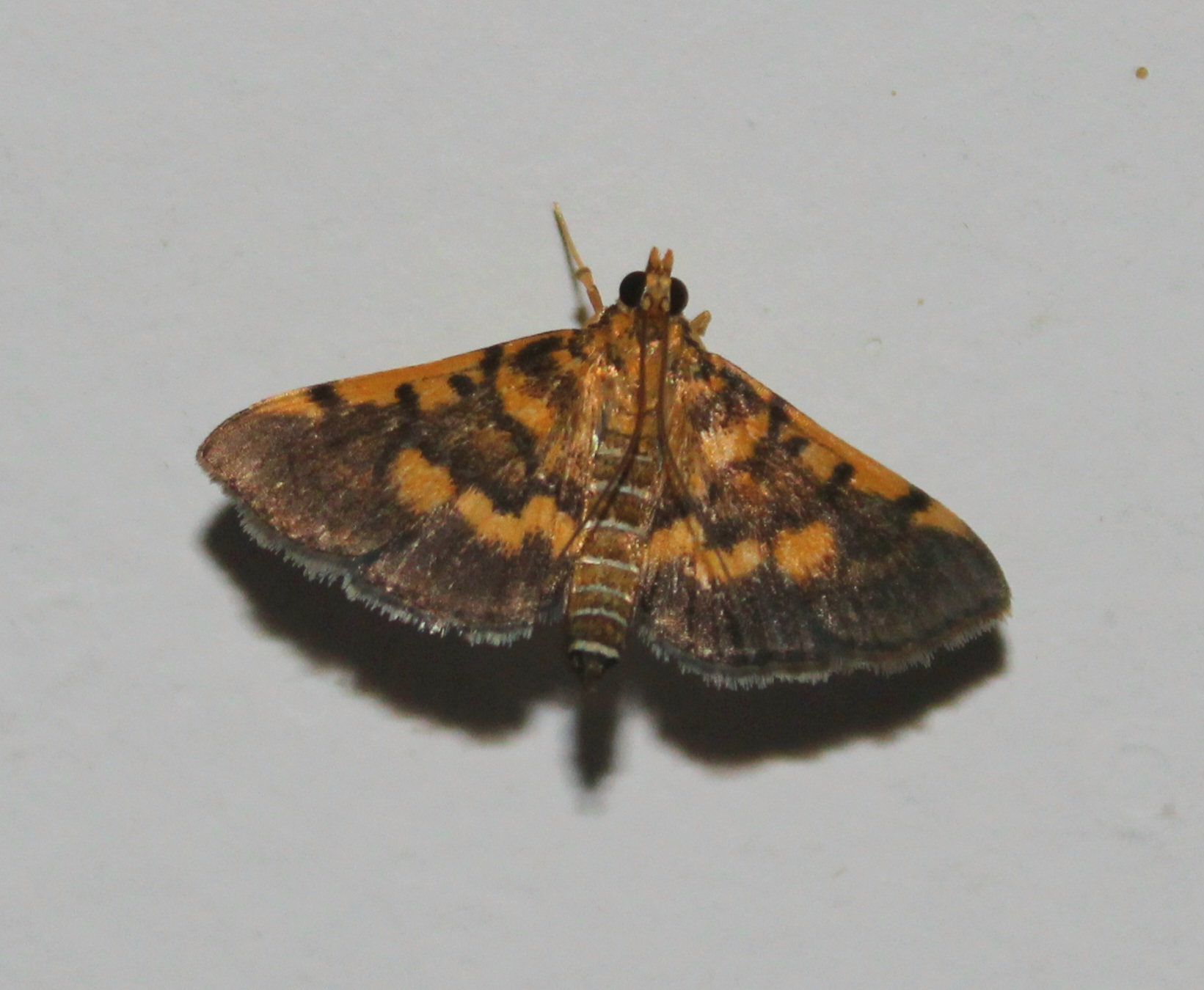

Scientific classification
- Kingdom: Animalia
- Phylum: Arthropoda
- Class: Insecta
- Order: Lepidoptera
- Family: Crambidae
- Genus: Omiodes
- Species: O. diemenalis

Binomial name
- Omiodes diemenalis (Guenée, 1854)

Synonyms
- Asopia diemenalis Guenée, 1854; Asopia lydialis Walker, 1859; Botys ustalis Lederer, 1863; Omiodes diementalis Inoue, 1996; Hedylepta pyraustalis Snellen, 1880; Pyralis incertalis Walker, 1866; Pyrausta absistalis Walker, 1859

= Omiodes diemenalis =

Species of moth

Omiodes diemenalis, the bean leafroller, is a moth in the family Crambidae. It was described by Achille Guenée in 1854. It is found in Indonesia (Sumatra, Ambon Island), Sri Lanka, India, the Cook Islands, China, Thailand, Papua New Guinea and Australia, where it has been recorded from the Northern Territory, Queensland and Tasmania.

The wingspan is about 20 mm. Adults are yellow with brown broad wavy bands and spots.
