= Omiodes sauterialis =

Scientific classification
- Kingdom: Animalia
- Phylum: Arthropoda
- Class: Insecta
- Order: Lepidoptera
- Family: Crambidae
- Genus: Omiodes
- Species: O. sauterialis

Binomial name
- Omiodes sauterialis (Strand, 1918)

Synonyms
- Hedylepta sauterialis Strand, 1918

Species of moth

Omiodes sauterialis is a moth in the family Crambidae. It was described by Strand in 1918. It is found in Taiwan. However, it is not listed on the Wikipedia page 'Moths of Taiwan, and there appears to be no photo of it, so its existence is questionable.
