= Omiodes trizonalis =

Scientific classification
- Domain: Eukaryota
- Kingdom: Animalia
- Phylum: Arthropoda
- Class: Insecta
- Order: Lepidoptera
- Family: Crambidae
- Genus: Omiodes
- Species: O. trizonalis

Binomial name
- Omiodes trizonalis (E. Hering, 1901)

Synonyms
- Hedylepta trizonalis E. Hering, 1901

Species of moth

Omiodes trizonalis is a moth in the family Crambidae. It was described by Hering in 1901. It is found in Indonesia (Lombok).
