= Omiodes maculicostalis =

Scientific classification
- Kingdom: Animalia
- Phylum: Arthropoda
- Class: Insecta
- Order: Lepidoptera
- Family: Crambidae
- Genus: Omiodes
- Species: O. maculicostalis

Binomial name
- Omiodes maculicostalis Hampson, 1893

Species of moth

Omiodes maculicostalis is a species of moth in the family Crambidae described by George Hampson in 1893 from Sri Lanka. It is present in Sri Lanka and India.

== Description ==
size 24mm. "Smoky black with a slight purple tinge; palpi below, thorax, and legs white. Fore wing with curved antemedial line; a post- medial white spot on costa; both wings with discocellular black spot and a postmedial line sinuous from costa to vein 2, then retracted to below end of cell, and on hind wing oblique to near anal angle; cilin tipped with white towards outer angle of fore wing and anal angle of hind wing. Underside greyish."
