= Omiodes collinsi =

Scientific classification
- Domain: Eukaryota
- Kingdom: Animalia
- Phylum: Arthropoda
- Class: Insecta
- Order: Lepidoptera
- Family: Crambidae
- Genus: Omiodes
- Species: O. collinsi

Binomial name
- Omiodes collinsi Whalley, 1962

Species of moth

Omiodes collinsi is a moth in the family Crambidae. It was described by Whalley in 1962. It is found on the Solomon Islands.
