= Omiodes meyricki =

Scientific classification
- Domain: Eukaryota
- Kingdom: Animalia
- Phylum: Arthropoda
- Class: Insecta
- Order: Lepidoptera
- Family: Crambidae
- Genus: Omiodes
- Species: O. meyricki

Binomial name
- Omiodes meyricki (C. Swinhoe, 1907)

Synonyms
- Merotoma meyricki C. Swinhoe, 1907; Merotoma dairalis Meyrick, 1894

Species of moth

Omiodes meyricki is a species of moth in the family Crambidae. It was described by Charles Swinhoe in 1907 and is found on Sulawesi in Indonesia.
