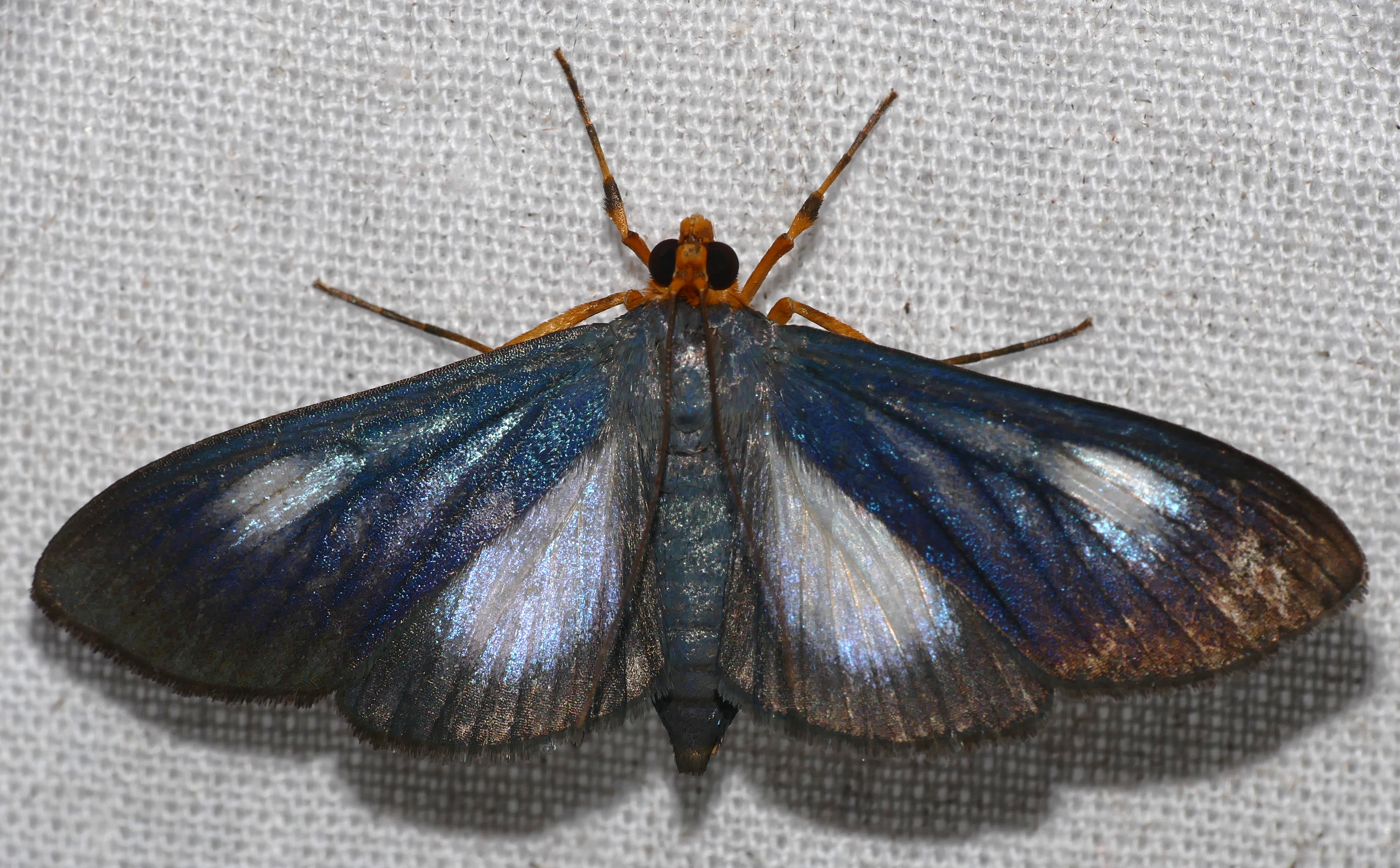

Scientific classification
- Domain: Eukaryota
- Kingdom: Animalia
- Phylum: Arthropoda
- Class: Insecta
- Order: Lepidoptera
- Family: Crambidae
- Genus: Omiodes
- Species: O. grandis

Binomial name
- Omiodes grandis (H. Druce, 1902)

Synonyms
- Phryganodes grandis H. Druce, 1902; Phostria cayennalis Schaus, 1920

= Omiodes grandis =

Species of moth

Omiodes grandis is a moth in the family Crambidae. It was described by Herbert Druce in 1902. It is found in Ecuador, Bolivia, French Guiana and Costa Rica.
