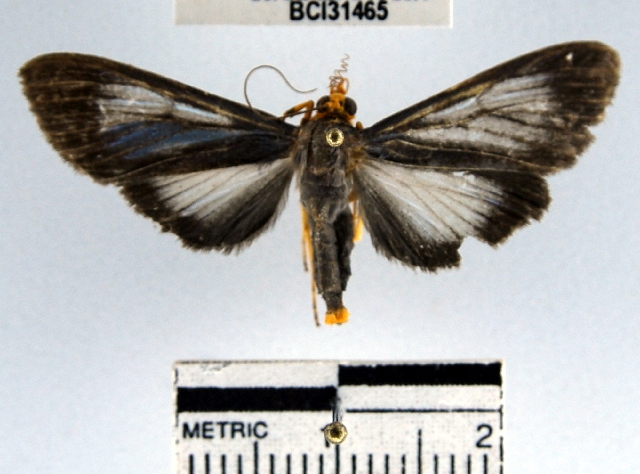

Scientific classification
- Kingdom: Animalia
- Phylum: Arthropoda
- Class: Insecta
- Order: Lepidoptera
- Family: Crambidae
- Genus: Omiodes
- Species: O. croceiceps

Binomial name
- Omiodes croceiceps (Walker, 1866)

Synonyms
- Erilusa croceiceps Walker, 1866; Phostria disciiridescens Hampson, 1918

= Omiodes croceiceps =

Species of moth

Omiodes croceiceps is a moth in the family Crambidae. It was described by Francis Walker in 1866. It is found in Brazil (Para, Amazonas, Ega), Peru, Panama and Costa Rica.
