= Omiodes dairalis =

Scientific classification
- Kingdom: Animalia
- Phylum: Arthropoda
- Class: Insecta
- Order: Lepidoptera
- Family: Crambidae
- Genus: Omiodes
- Species: O. dairalis

Binomial name
- Omiodes dairalis (Walker, 1859)

Synonyms
- Botys dairalis Walker, 1859

Species of moth

Omiodes dairalis is a moth in the family Crambidae. It was described by Francis Walker in 1859. It is found on Borneo and in China.
