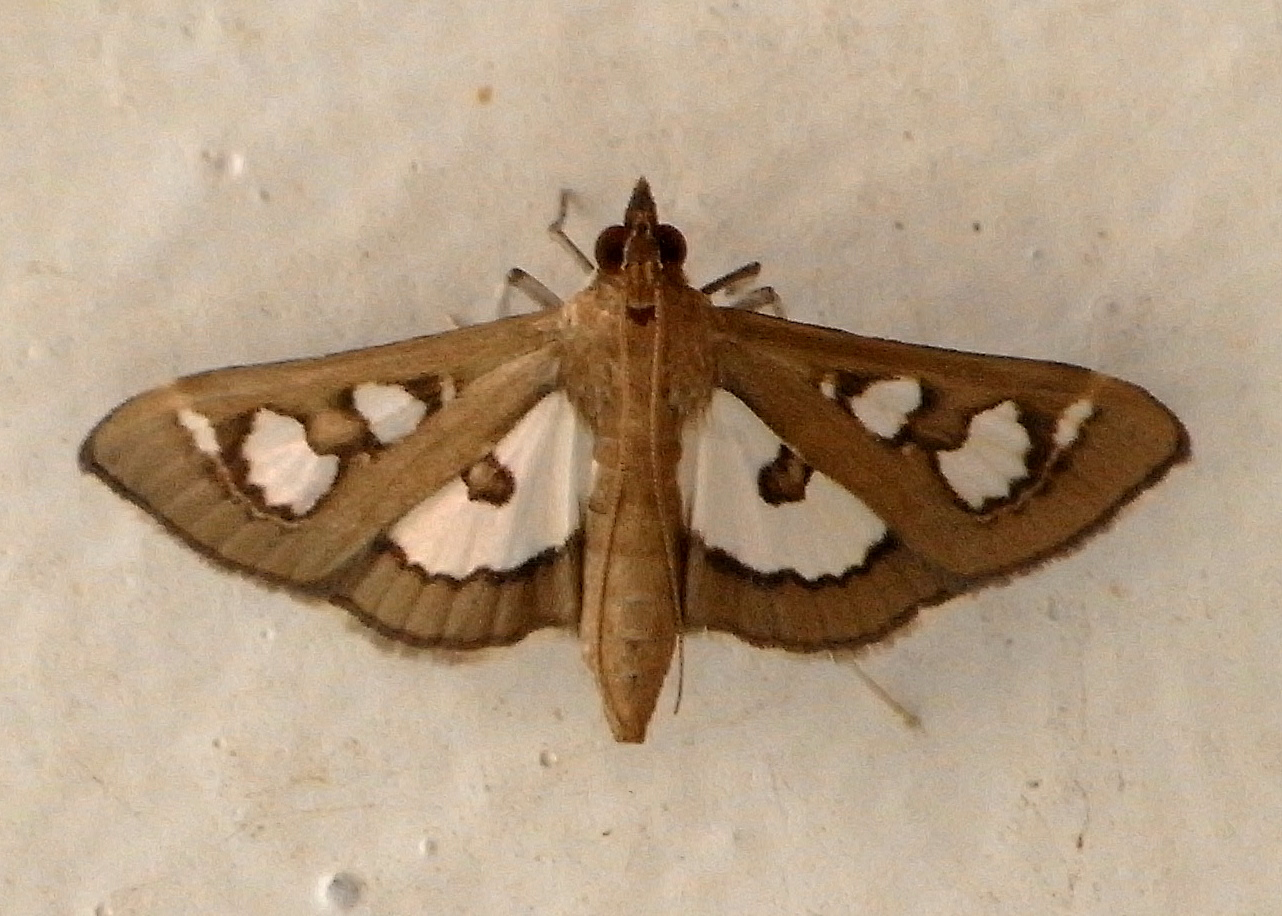

Scientific classification
- Kingdom: Animalia
- Phylum: Arthropoda
- Class: Insecta
- Order: Lepidoptera
- Family: Crambidae
- Genus: Omiodes
- Species: O. odontosticta

Binomial name
- Omiodes odontosticta (Hampson, 1898)

Synonyms
- Phostria odontosticta Hampson, 1898; Phryganodes odontosticta

= Omiodes odontosticta =

Species of moth

Omiodes odontosticta is a species of moth in the family Crambidae. It was first described by George Hampson in 1898 and is found Australia in Northern Territory and Queensland.

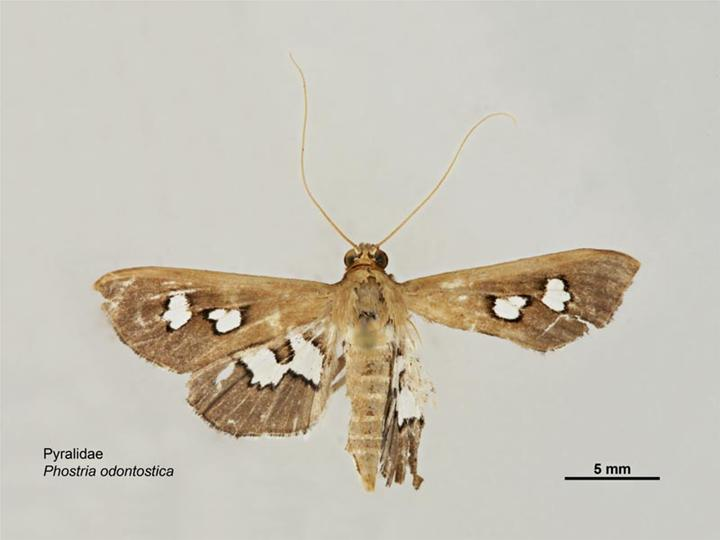
Dorsal view

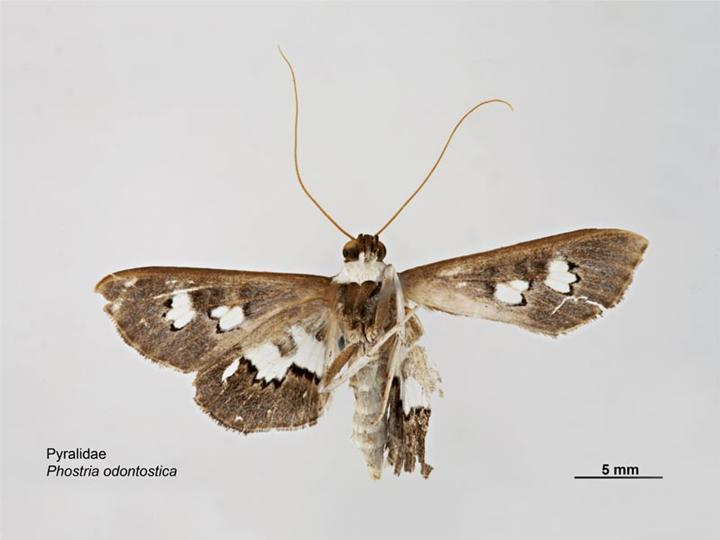
Ventral view

The wingspan is about 30 mm.
