= Omiodes contubernalis =

Scientific classification
- Domain: Eukaryota
- Kingdom: Animalia
- Phylum: Arthropoda
- Class: Insecta
- Order: Lepidoptera
- Family: Crambidae
- Genus: Omiodes
- Species: O. contubernalis

Binomial name
- Omiodes contubernalis (Moore, 1888)

Synonyms
- Hedylepta contubernalis Moore, 1888

Species of moth

Omiodes contubernalis is a moth in the family Crambidae. It was described by Frederic Moore in 1888. It is found in India.
