= Omiodes martini =

Scientific classification
- Domain: Eukaryota
- Kingdom: Animalia
- Phylum: Arthropoda
- Class: Insecta
- Order: Lepidoptera
- Family: Crambidae
- Genus: Omiodes
- Species: O. martini

Binomial name
- Omiodes martini Amsel, 1956

Species of moth

Omiodes martini is a moth in the family Crambidae. It was described by Hans Georg Amsel in 1956 and is found in Venezuela and Costa Rica.
