= Omiodes monogramma =

Scientific classification
- Kingdom: Animalia
- Phylum: Arthropoda
- Class: Insecta
- Order: Lepidoptera
- Family: Crambidae
- Genus: Omiodes
- Species: O. monogramma

Binomial name
- Omiodes monogramma Meyrick, 1899

Synonyms
- Phostria monogramma; Hedylepta monogramma

Species of moth

Omiodes monogramma is a moth of the family Crambidae. It is endemic to the Hawaiian islands of Kauai, Oahu, Molokai and Hawaii.

The larvae feed on Dianella odorata.
