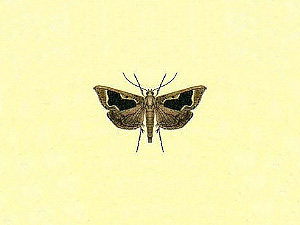

Conservation status
- Critically Endangered (IUCN 3.1)

Scientific classification
- Kingdom: Animalia
- Phylum: Arthropoda
- Class: Insecta
- Order: Lepidoptera
- Family: Crambidae
- Genus: Omiodes
- Species: O. euryprora

Binomial name
- Omiodes euryprora Meyrick, 1899

Synonyms
- Hedylepta euryprora (Meyrick, 1899); Phostria euryprora

= Olaʻa banana hedyleptan moth =

Species of moth

The Olaʻa banana hedyleptan moth (Omiodes euryprora) is a species of moth in the family Crambidae. It is endemic to the Hawaiian Islands (Olaa Forest).

This species was previously listed as Hedylepta euryprora and assessed as extinct. Information since the last assessment in 1996 suggests that this species is still extant in the Hawaiian Islands.

The larvae feed on banana.

== Sources ==
- Zimmerman, Elwood C. (1958). Insects of Hawaii. Vol. 8 Lepidoptera: Pyraloidea. University of Hawaii Press. hdl:10125/7337.
