= Omiodes iridias =

Scientific classification
- Kingdom: Animalia
- Phylum: Arthropoda
- Class: Insecta
- Order: Lepidoptera
- Family: Crambidae
- Genus: Omiodes
- Species: O. iridias

Binomial name
- Omiodes iridias Meyrick, 1899

Synonyms
- Hedylepta iridias; Phostria iridias

Species of moth

Omiodes iridias is a moth of the family Crambidae. It is endemic to the island of Hawaii.

The larvae feed on Astelia veratroides.
