= Omiodes pritchardii =

Scientific classification
- Domain: Eukaryota
- Kingdom: Animalia
- Phylum: Arthropoda
- Class: Insecta
- Order: Lepidoptera
- Family: Crambidae
- Genus: Omiodes
- Species: O. pritchardii

Binomial name
- Omiodes pritchardii Swezey, 1948

Synonyms
- Hedylepta pritchardii

Species of moth

Omiodes pritchardii is a moth of the family Crambidae. It was described by Otto Herman Swezey in 1948 and is endemic to the island of Hawaii.

The wingspan is about 30 mm.

The larvae feed on Pritchardia beccariana.
