= Meyrick's banana hedyleptan moth =

Conservation status
- Data Deficient (IUCN 3.1)

Scientific classification
- Kingdom: Animalia
- Phylum: Arthropoda
- Class: Insecta
- Order: Lepidoptera
- Family: Crambidae
- Genus: Omiodes
- Species: O. meyrickii

Binomial name
- Omiodes meyrickii Swezey, 1907

Synonyms
- Hedylepta meyricki Swezey, 1907; Lamprosema svezeyi Hampson, 1918; Phostria swezei Klima, 1939

Species of moth

Meyrick's banana hedyleptan moth (Omiodes meyrickii) is a species of moth in the family Pyralidae. It was described by Otto Herman Swezey in 1907 and is endemic to the island of Oʻahu in Hawaiʻi.

== Sources ==
- Haines, W.P. (2004). "Omiodes meyricki". IUCN Red List of Threatened Species. 2004 e.T44548A10918270. doi:10.2305/IUCN.UK.2004.RLTS.T44548A10918270.en.
- Zimmerman, Elwood C. (1958). Insects of Hawaii. Vol. 8 Lepidoptera: Pyraloidea. University of Hawaii Press. hdl:10125/7337.
