= Omiodes longipennis =

Scientific classification
- Domain: Eukaryota
- Kingdom: Animalia
- Phylum: Arthropoda
- Class: Insecta
- Order: Lepidoptera
- Family: Crambidae
- Genus: Omiodes
- Species: O. longipennis

Binomial name
- Omiodes longipennis (Warren, 1896)

Synonyms
- Charema longipennis Warren, 1896

Species of moth

Omiodes longipennis is a moth in the family Crambidae. It was described by Warren in 1896. It is found in India (Meghalaya).
