= Omiodes giffardi =

Scientific classification
- Domain: Eukaryota
- Kingdom: Animalia
- Phylum: Arthropoda
- Class: Insecta
- Order: Lepidoptera
- Family: Crambidae
- Genus: Omiodes
- Species: O. giffardi

Binomial name
- Omiodes giffardi Swezey, 1921

Synonyms
- Hedylepta giffardi; Phostria giffardi

Species of moth

Omiodes giffardi is a moth of the family Crambidae. It was described by Otto Herman Swezey in 1921 and is endemic to the island of Hawaii.

The larvae feed on Isachne distichophylla.
