= Omiodes ochracea =

Scientific classification
- Kingdom: Animalia
- Phylum: Arthropoda
- Clade: Pancrustacea
- Class: Insecta
- Order: Lepidoptera
- Family: Crambidae
- Genus: Omiodes
- Species: O. ochracea

Binomial name
- Omiodes ochracea Gentili & Solis, 1998

Species of moth

Omiodes ochracea is a moth in the family Crambidae. It was described by Patricia Gentili-Poole and Maria Alma Solis in 1998. It is found in Costa Rica.
