= Omiodes maia =

Scientific classification
- Domain: Eukaryota
- Kingdom: Animalia
- Phylum: Arthropoda
- Class: Insecta
- Order: Lepidoptera
- Family: Crambidae
- Genus: Omiodes
- Species: O. maia

Binomial name
- Omiodes maia (Swezey, 1909)

Synonyms
- Hedylepta maia Swezey, 1909

Species of moth

Omiodes maia is a moth of the family Crambidae. It is endemic to the Hawaiian islands of Kauai and Oahu.

The larvae feed on banana.
