= Omiodes surrectalis =

Scientific classification
- Kingdom: Animalia
- Phylum: Arthropoda
- Class: Insecta
- Order: Lepidoptera
- Family: Crambidae
- Genus: Omiodes
- Species: O. surrectalis

Binomial name
- Omiodes surrectalis (Walker, 1866)

Synonyms
- Deba surrectalis Walker, 1866

Species of insect

Omiodes surrectalis is a moth in the family Crambidae. Described by Francis Walker in 1866, it is found in the Democratic Republic of the Congo, India, Indonesia (Java, Sulawesi), the Philippines, Sri Lanka, New Guinea and Queensland, Australia.
