= Omiodes spoliatalis =

Scientific classification
- Domain: Eukaryota
- Kingdom: Animalia
- Phylum: Arthropoda
- Class: Insecta
- Order: Lepidoptera
- Family: Crambidae
- Genus: Omiodes
- Species: O. spoliatalis

Binomial name
- Omiodes spoliatalis (Lederer, 1863)

Synonyms
- Botys spoliatalis Lederer, 1863

Species of moth

Omiodes spoliatalis is a moth in the family Crambidae. It was described by Julius Lederer in 1863. It was described from North America.
