= Omiodes leucostrepta =

Scientific classification
- Kingdom: Animalia
- Phylum: Arthropoda
- Class: Insecta
- Order: Lepidoptera
- Family: Crambidae
- Genus: Omiodes
- Species: O. leucostrepta

Binomial name
- Omiodes leucostrepta Meyrick, 1886

Species of moth

Omiodes leucostrepta is a moth in the family Crambidae. It was described by British entomologist Edward Meyrick in 1886. It is found in Tonga and Fiji.
