= Omiodes tristrialis =

Scientific classification
- Domain: Eukaryota
- Kingdom: Animalia
- Phylum: Arthropoda
- Class: Insecta
- Order: Lepidoptera
- Family: Crambidae
- Genus: Omiodes
- Species: O. tristrialis

Binomial name
- Omiodes tristrialis (Bremer, 1864)

Synonyms
- Botys tristrialis Bremer, 1864; Hedylepta confusalis Warren, 1896; Herpetogramma fuscescens Bae, 2001 (nec. Warren)

Species of moth

Omiodes tristrialis is a moth in the family Crambidae. It was described by Otto Vasilievich Bremer in 1864. It is found in the Russian Far East (Amur), China, Taiwan and Japan.

The wingspan is about 20 mm.
