= Omiodes monogona =

Scientific classification
- Kingdom: Animalia
- Phylum: Arthropoda
- Class: Insecta
- Order: Lepidoptera
- Family: Crambidae
- Genus: Omiodes
- Species: O. monogona

Binomial name
- Omiodes monogona Meyrick, 1888

Synonyms
- Hedylepta monogona; Nacoleia monogona; Phostria monogona; Omiodes liodyta Meyrick, 1888

Species of moth

Omiodes monogona, the Hawaiian bean leafroller, is a moth of the family Crambidae. It is endemic to the Hawaiian islands of Kauai, Oahu, Molokai, Maui, Lanai and Hawaii. It was first cited as possibly extinct by the U.S. Fish & Wildlife Service in 1994. It was listed as extinct by the Hawaiʻi Biological Survey in 2002, but was rediscovered later in 2003.
