= Omiodes pyraustalis =

Scientific classification
- Domain: Eukaryota
- Kingdom: Animalia
- Phylum: Arthropoda
- Class: Insecta
- Order: Lepidoptera
- Family: Crambidae
- Genus: Omiodes
- Species: O. pyraustalis

Binomial name
- Omiodes pyraustalis (Strand, 1918)

Synonyms
- Calamochrous pyraustalis Strand, 1918

Species of moth

Omiodes pyraustalis is a moth in the family Crambidae. It was described by Strand in 1918. It is found in Taiwan.
