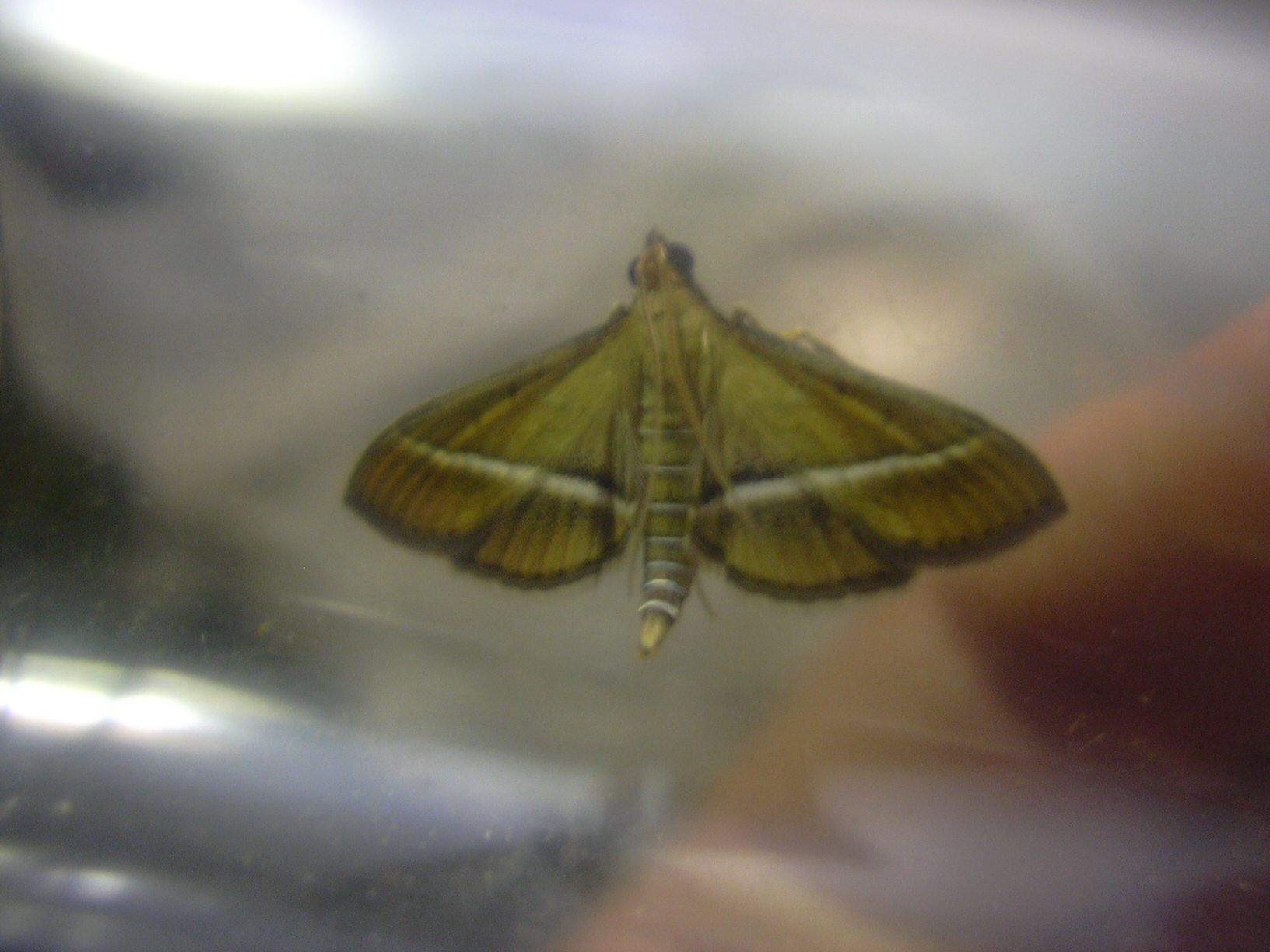

Scientific classification
- Kingdom: Animalia
- Phylum: Arthropoda
- Class: Insecta
- Order: Lepidoptera
- Family: Crambidae
- Genus: Omiodes
- Species: O. demaratalis

Binomial name
- Omiodes demaratalis (Walker, 1859)

Synonyms
- Botys demaratalis Walker, 1859; Hedylepta demaratalis; Nacoleia demaratalis; Phostria demaratalis

= Omiodes demaratalis =

Species of moth

Omiodes demaratalis, the Hawaiian grass leafroller, is a species of moth in the family Crambidae. It is endemic to the Hawaiian islands of Niihau, Kauai, Oahu, Molokai, Maui and Hawaii.

The larvae feed on various grasses, such as Panicum species (including Panicum purpurascens and Panicum torridum), Sporobolus virginicus, Digitaria pruriens and Paspalum conjugatum. They roll the leaves of their host plant. Full-grown larvae are 22–25 mm long and grass green.

The pupa is 12 mm long and very dark brown. The pupal period lasts about 12 days.
