= Omiodes stigmosalis =

Scientific classification
- Domain: Eukaryota
- Kingdom: Animalia
- Phylum: Arthropoda
- Class: Insecta
- Order: Lepidoptera
- Family: Crambidae
- Genus: Omiodes
- Species: O. stigmosalis

Binomial name
- Omiodes stigmosalis (Warren, 1892)

Synonyms
- Boeotarcha stigmosalis Warren, 1892; Boeotarcha exogrammalis Dyar, 1914

Species of moth

Omiodes stigmosalis is a moth in the family Crambidae. It was described by Warren in 1892. It is found in Brazil, Panama, Costa Rica, Mexico, Florida and Cuba.

The wingspan is 24–26 mm. Adults have been recorded on wing from March to August and from October to December in Florida.
