= Omiodes pseudocuniculalis =

Scientific classification
- Kingdom: Animalia
- Phylum: Arthropoda
- Clade: Pancrustacea
- Class: Insecta
- Order: Lepidoptera
- Family: Crambidae
- Genus: Omiodes
- Species: O. pseudocuniculalis

Binomial name
- Omiodes pseudocuniculalis Gentili & Solis, 2000

Species of moth

Omiodes pseudocuniculalis is a moth in the family Crambidae. It was described by Patricia Gentili-Poole and Maria Alma Solis in 2000. It is found in Ecuador (Loja Province), Peru and Bolivia.
