= Oahu Swamp hedyleptan moth =

Conservation status
- Critically Endangered (IUCN 3.1)

Scientific classification
- Kingdom: Animalia
- Phylum: Arthropoda
- Class: Insecta
- Order: Lepidoptera
- Family: Crambidae
- Genus: Omiodes
- Species: O. epicentra

Binomial name
- Omiodes epicentra Meyrick, 1899

Synonyms
- Hedylepta epicentra (Meyrick, 1899)

Species of moth

The Oahu Swamp hedyleptan moth (Omiodes epicentra) is a species of moth in the family Crambidae that is endemic to Hawaii.
