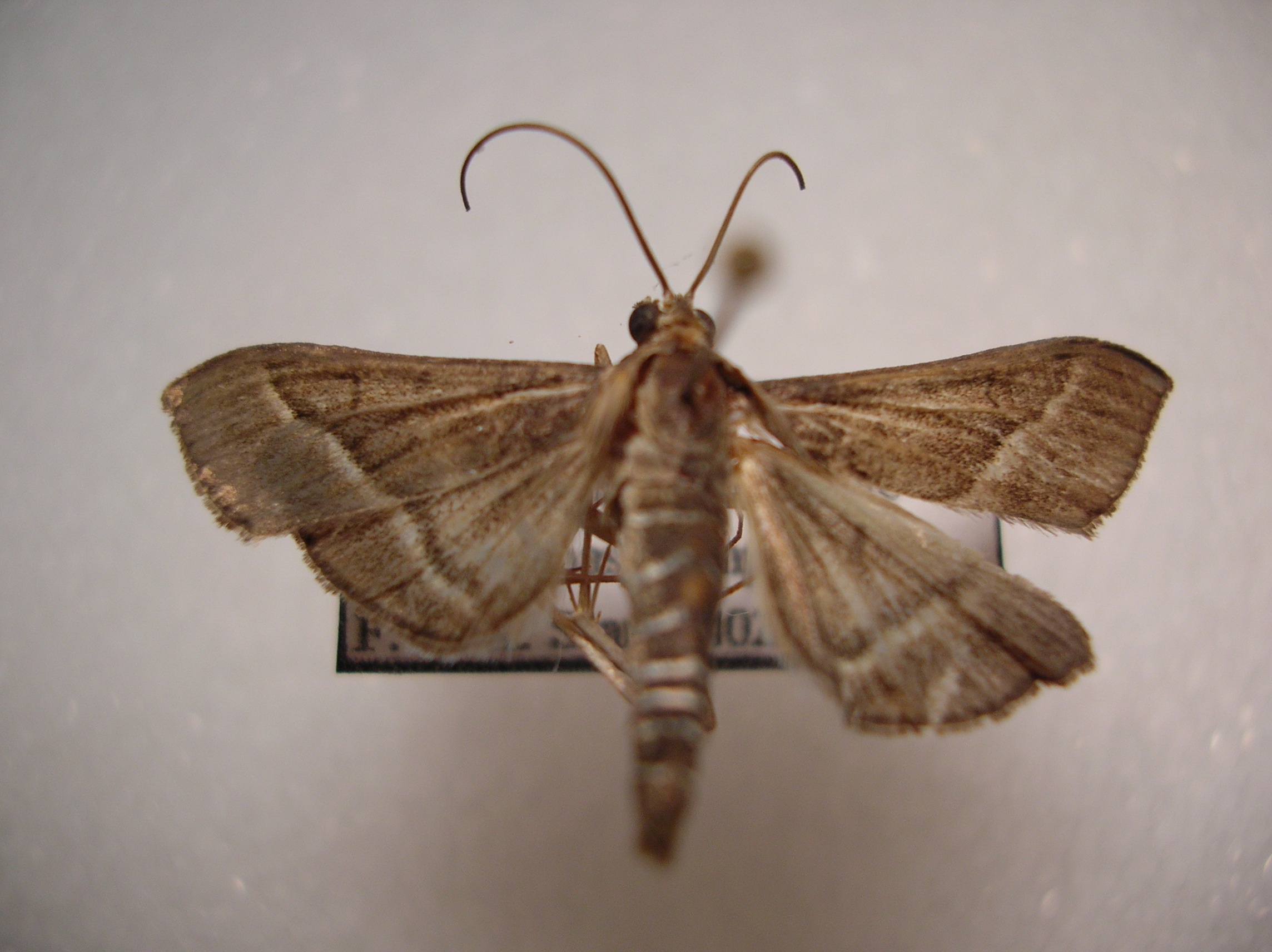

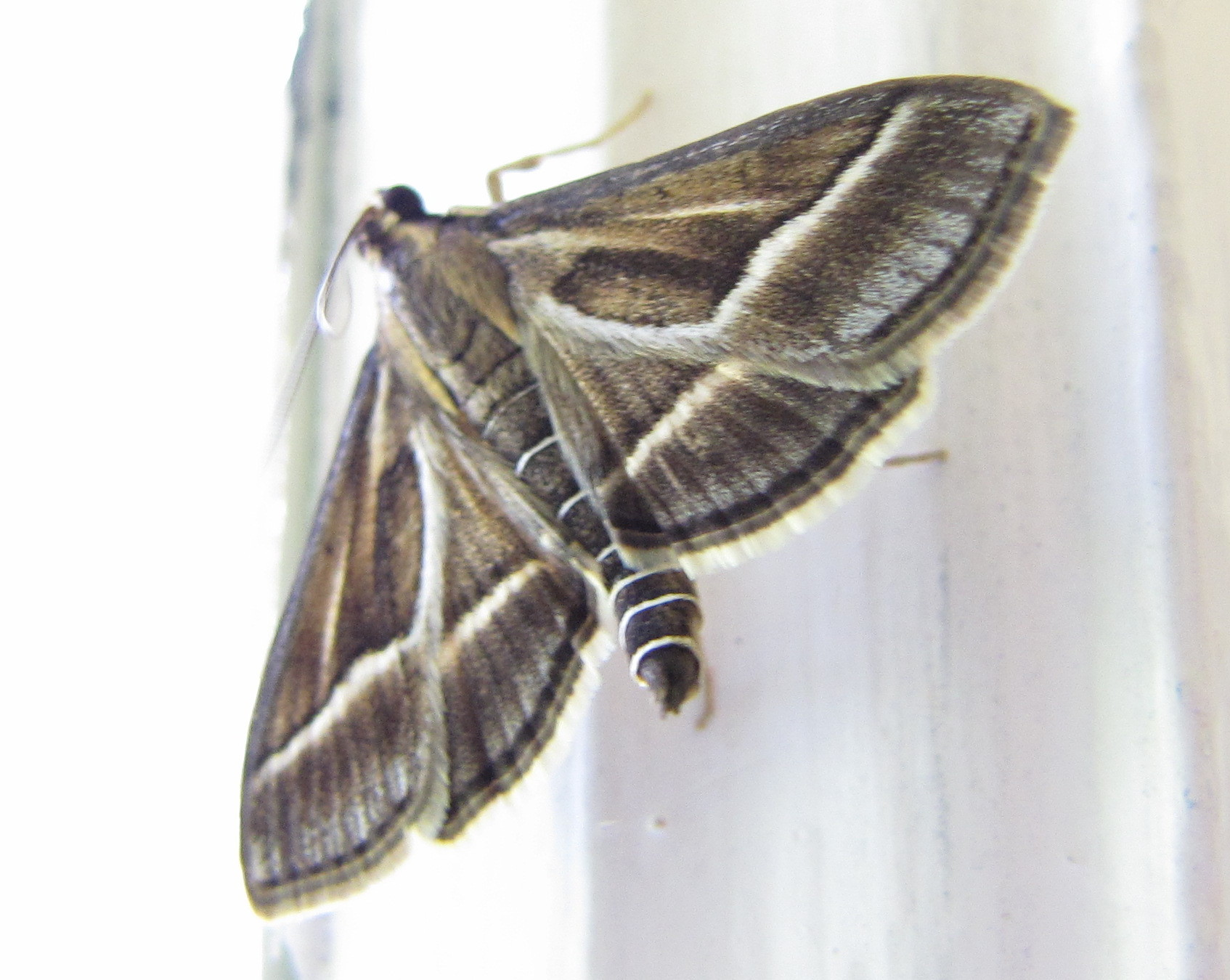

Conservation status
- Near Threatened (IUCN 3.1)

Scientific classification
- Kingdom: Animalia
- Phylum: Arthropoda
- Class: Insecta
- Order: Lepidoptera
- Family: Crambidae
- Genus: Omiodes
- Species: O. continuatalis

Binomial name
- Omiodes continuatalis (Wallengren, 1860)

Synonyms
- Salbia continuatalis Wallengren, 1860; Botys continuatalis; Loxocreon continuatalis; Nacoleia continentalis; Phostria continuatalis; Hedylepta continuatalis

= Omiodes continuatalis =

Species of moth

Omiodes continuatalis is a species of moth in the family Crambidae. It is endemic to the Hawaiian islands of Kauai, Oahu, Molokai, Maui, Lanai and Hawaii. It was first cited as possibly extinct by W.C. Gagné and Francis Gard Howarth in 1982. It was listed as extinct by the Hawaiʻi Biological Survey in 2002 and the IUCN in 2003, but was rediscovered later in 2003.

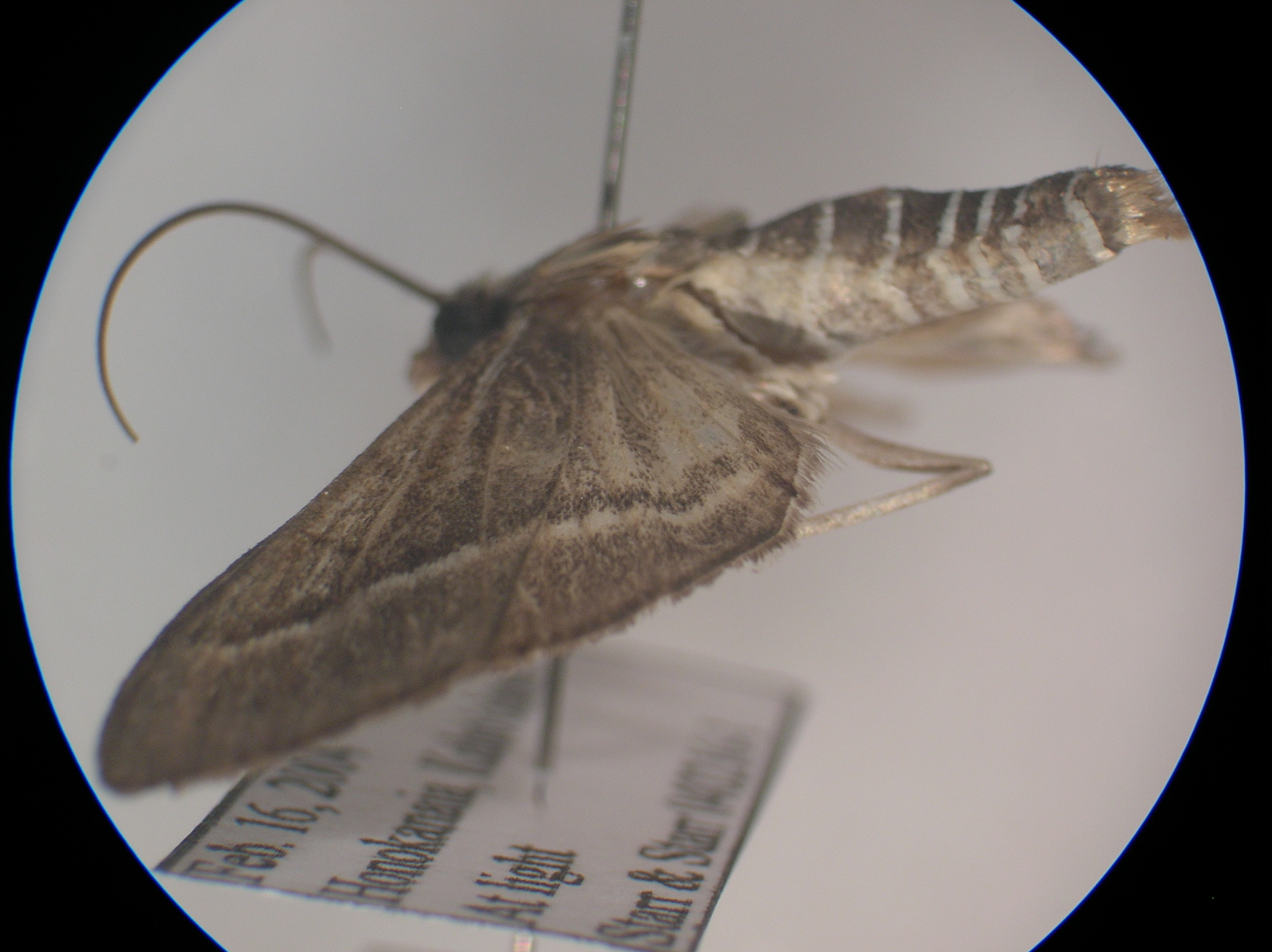

Full-grown larvae are 28–30 mm long. It is 13–15 mm long and very dark brown. The pupal period lasts 12–15 days.
