= Omiodes argentigulalis =

Scientific classification
- Domain: Eukaryota
- Kingdom: Animalia
- Phylum: Arthropoda
- Class: Insecta
- Order: Lepidoptera
- Family: Crambidae
- Genus: Omiodes
- Species: O. argentigulalis

Binomial name
- Omiodes argentigulalis (Schaus, 1912)

Synonyms
- Phryganodes argentigulalis Schaus, 1912; Phryganodes argentiligualis Sharp, 1913

Species of moth

Omiodes argentigulalis is a moth in the family Crambidae. It was described by Schaus in 1912. It is found in Costa Rica.
