= Omiodes granulata =

Scientific classification
- Domain: Eukaryota
- Kingdom: Animalia
- Phylum: Arthropoda
- Class: Insecta
- Order: Lepidoptera
- Family: Crambidae
- Genus: Omiodes
- Species: O. granulata

Binomial name
- Omiodes granulata (Warren, 1896)

Synonyms
- Pachyzancla granulata Warren, 1896

Species of moth

Omiodes granulata is a moth in the family Crambidae. It was described by Warren in 1896. It is found in India (Khasi Hills).
