= Omiodes scotaea =

Scientific classification
- Kingdom: Animalia
- Phylum: Arthropoda
- Class: Insecta
- Order: Lepidoptera
- Family: Crambidae
- Genus: Omiodes
- Species: O. scotaea

Binomial name
- Omiodes scotaea (Hampson, 1912)

Synonyms
- Nacoleia scotaea Hampson, 1912; Hedylepta scotaea; Phostria scotala

Species of moth

Omiodes scotaea is a moth of the family Crambidae. It is endemic to the Hawaiian islands of Oahu, Molokai and Hawaii.

The larvae feed on Astelia veratroides.
