= Omiodes simialis =

Scientific classification
- Kingdom: Animalia
- Phylum: Arthropoda
- Clade: Pancrustacea
- Class: Insecta
- Order: Lepidoptera
- Family: Crambidae
- Genus: Omiodes
- Species: O. simialis

Binomial name
- Omiodes simialis Guenée, 1854

Synonyms
- Botys jasonalis Walker, 1859; Botys orontesalis Walker, 1859; Coenostola eruptalis Lederer, 1863

Species of moth

Omiodes simialis is a moth in the family Crambidae. It was described by Achille Guenée in 1854. It is found in Brazil, Venezuela, French Guiana, the West Indies (Cuba, Puerto Rico, Hispaniola), Honduras, Costa Rica and Florida.

The wingspan is about 31 mm. Adults are on wing in March, May, August and from October to December in Florida.

The larvae feed on Dalbergia ecastaphyllum.
