= Omiodes indistincta =

Scientific classification
- Domain: Eukaryota
- Kingdom: Animalia
- Phylum: Arthropoda
- Class: Insecta
- Order: Lepidoptera
- Family: Crambidae
- Genus: Omiodes
- Species: O. indistincta

Binomial name
- Omiodes indistincta (Warren, 1892)

Synonyms
- Acharana indistincta Warren, 1892

Species of moth

Omiodes indistincta is a Crambidae family moth. Warren first discovered it in 1892. It may be found in Japan and China.
