= Omiodes nipponalis =

Scientific classification
- Domain: Eukaryota
- Kingdom: Animalia
- Phylum: Arthropoda
- Class: Insecta
- Order: Lepidoptera
- Family: Crambidae
- Genus: Omiodes
- Species: O. nipponalis

Binomial name
- Omiodes nipponalis Yamanaka, 2005

Species of moth

Omiodes nipponalis is a moth in the family Crambidae. It was described by Hiroshi Yamanaka in 2005. It is found in Japan (Kyushu) and China.
