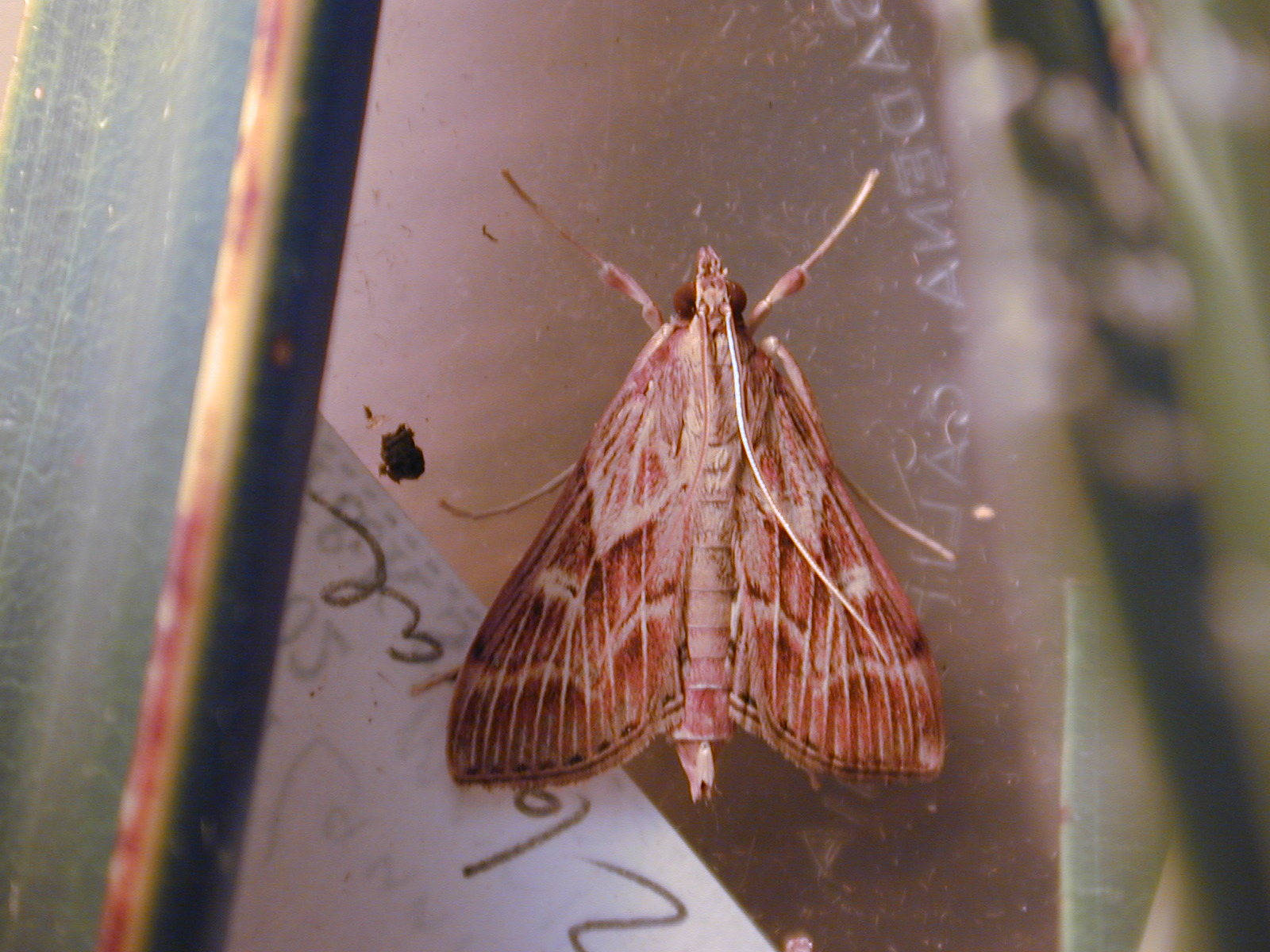

Scientific classification
- Domain: Eukaryota
- Kingdom: Animalia
- Phylum: Arthropoda
- Class: Insecta
- Order: Lepidoptera
- Family: Crambidae
- Genus: Omiodes
- Species: O. blackburni

Binomial name
- Omiodes blackburni (Butler, 1877)

Synonyms
- Botys blackburni Butler, 1877; Hedylepta blackburni; Nacoleia blackburni; Lamprosema blackburni; Phostria blackburni

= Omiodes blackburni =

Species of moth

Omiodes blackburni, the coconut leafroller, is a species of moth in the family Crambidae. It is endemic to the Hawaiian islands of Kauai, Oahu, Molokai, Maui, Lanai and Hawaii. The species was first described by Arthur Gardiner Butler in 1877.

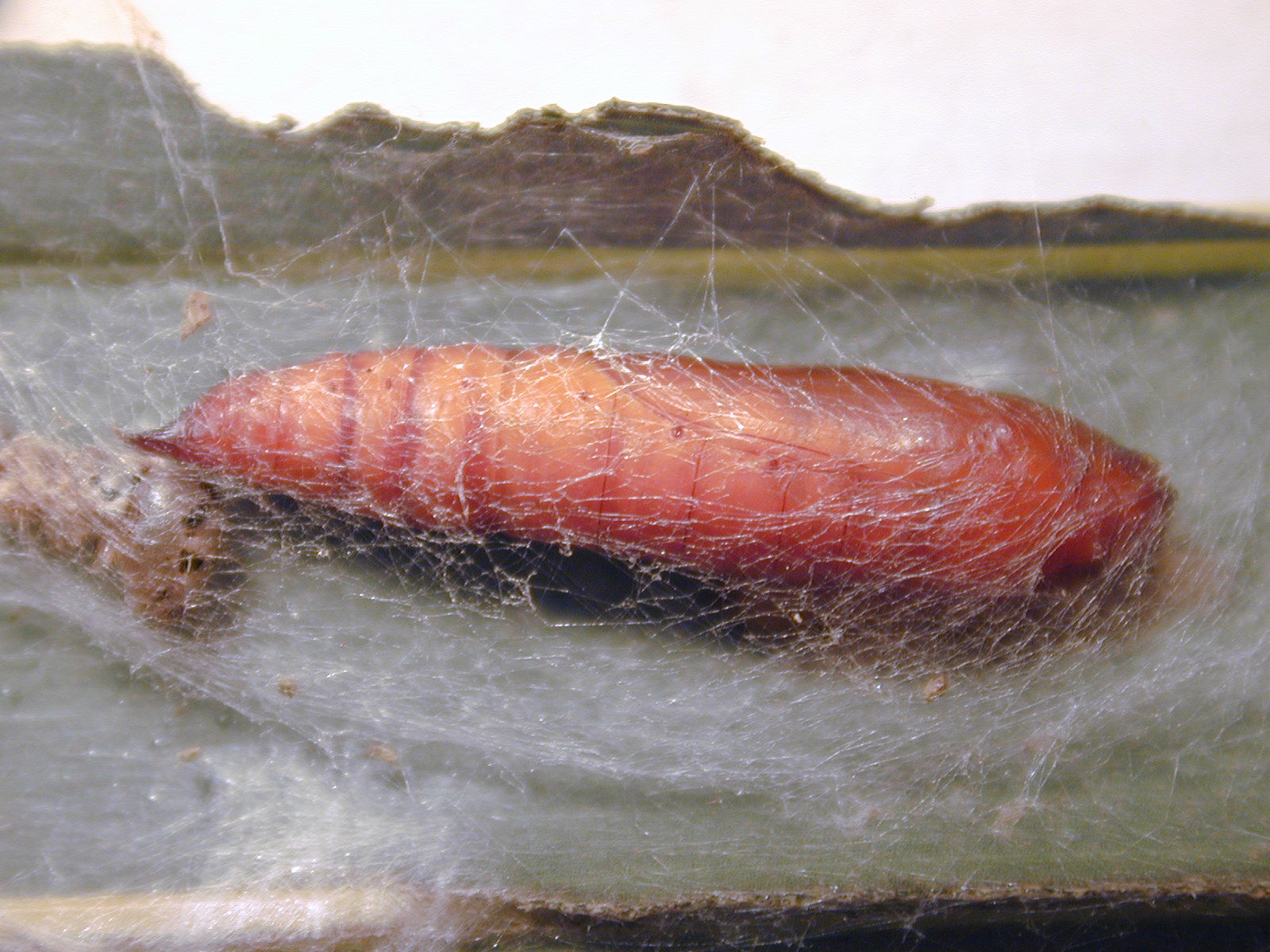
Pupa

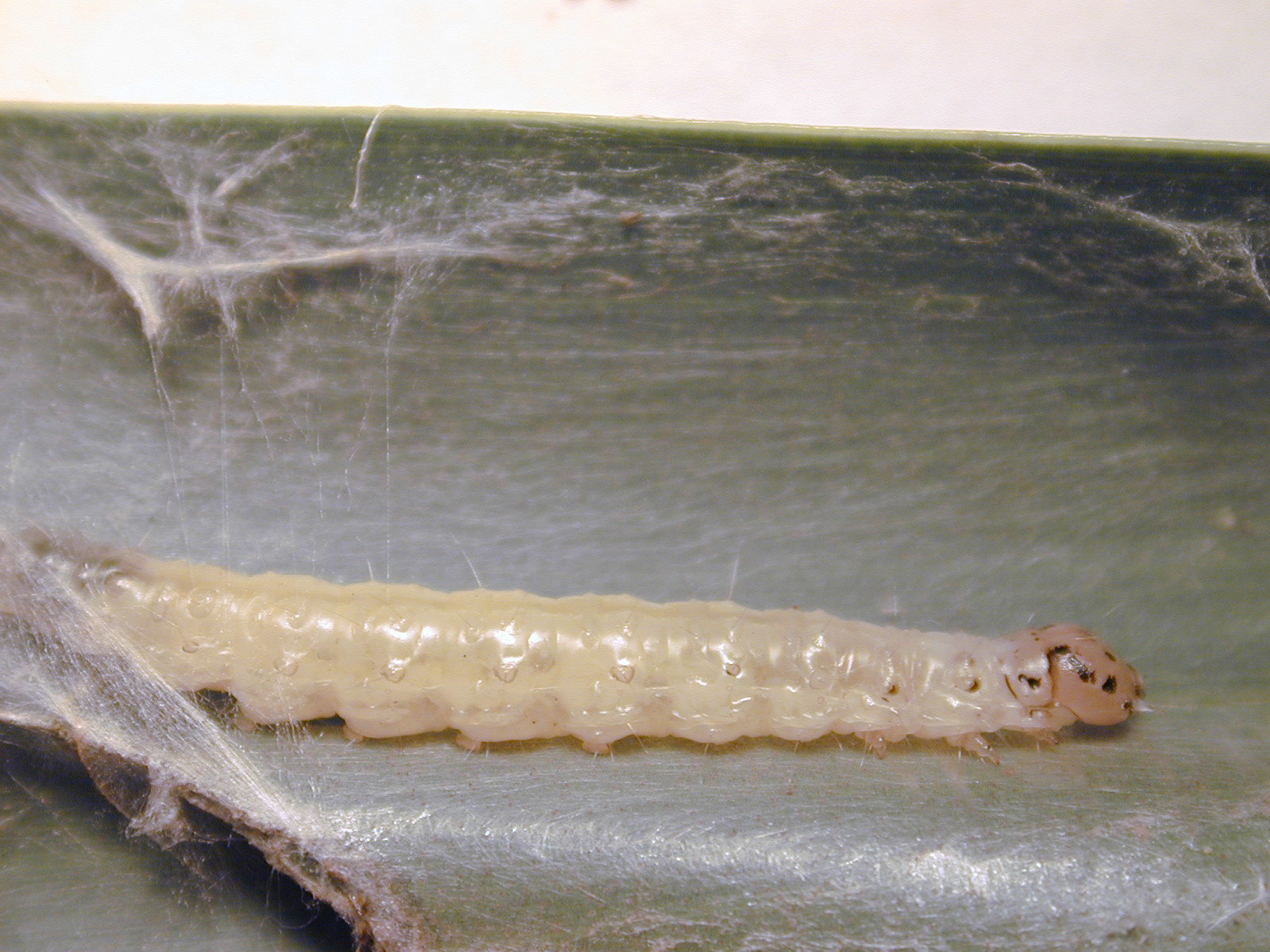
Caterpillar

Recorded food plants include Cocos nucifera, but it occasionally also feeds on Pritchardia (including Pritchardia pacifica), banana and introduced palms.
