= Omiodes nitida =

Scientific classification
- Kingdom: Animalia
- Phylum: Arthropoda
- Class: Insecta
- Order: Lepidoptera
- Family: Crambidae
- Genus: Omiodes
- Species: O. nitida

Binomial name
- Omiodes nitida (Hampson, 1912)

Synonyms
- Nacoleia nitida Hampson, 1912

Species of moth

Omiodes nitida is a moth in the family Crambidae. It was described by George Hampson in 1912. It is found in Colombia and Costa Rica.
