= Omiodes basalticalis =

Scientific classification
- Domain: Eukaryota
- Kingdom: Animalia
- Phylum: Arthropoda
- Class: Insecta
- Order: Lepidoptera
- Family: Crambidae
- Genus: Omiodes
- Species: O. basalticalis

Binomial name
- Omiodes basalticalis (Lederer, 1863)

Synonyms
- Spargeta basalticalis Lederer, 1863; Botys amplipennis Butler, 1882

Species of moth

Omiodes basalticalis is a moth in the family Crambidae. It was described by Julius Lederer in 1863. It is found in Australia, Papua New Guinea and Ambon Island and Aru in Indonesia.
