= Omiodes camphorae =

Scientific classification
- Domain: Eukaryota
- Kingdom: Animalia
- Phylum: Arthropoda
- Class: Insecta
- Order: Lepidoptera
- Family: Crambidae
- Genus: Omiodes
- Species: O. camphorae

Binomial name
- Omiodes camphorae (Tams, 1928)

Synonyms
- Lamprosema camphorae Tams, 1928

Species of moth

Omiodes camphorae is a moth in the family Crambidae. It was described by Willie Horace Thomas Tams in 1928. It is found in Malaysia.
