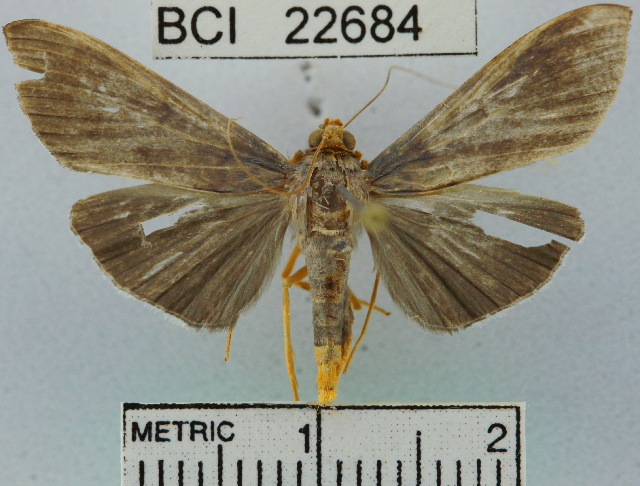

Scientific classification
- Kingdom: Animalia
- Phylum: Arthropoda
- Class: Insecta
- Order: Lepidoptera
- Family: Crambidae
- Genus: Omiodes
- Species: O. fulvicauda

Binomial name
- Omiodes fulvicauda (Hampson, 1898)

Synonyms
- Phryganodes fulvicauda Hampson, 1898

= Omiodes fulvicauda =

Species of moth

Omiodes fulvicauda is a moth in the family Crambidae. It was described by George Hampson in 1898. It is found in Venezuela, Costa Rica and Panama.
