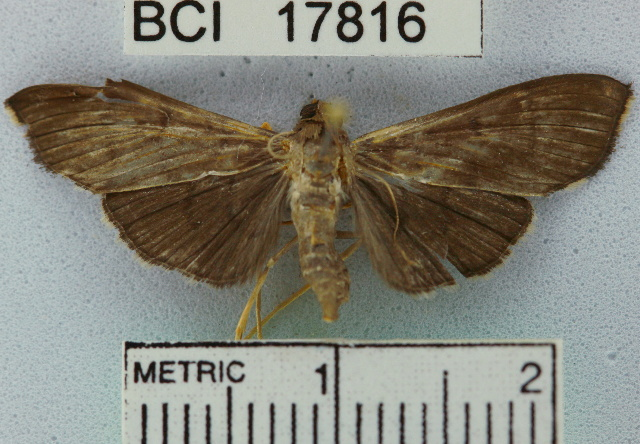

Scientific classification
- Kingdom: Animalia
- Phylum: Arthropoda
- Class: Insecta
- Order: Lepidoptera
- Family: Crambidae
- Genus: Omiodes
- Species: O. humeralis

Binomial name
- Omiodes humeralis Guenée, 1854

Synonyms
- Botys gnomalis Walker, 1859; Botys peleusalis Walker, 1859

= Omiodes humeralis =

Species of moth

Omiodes humeralis is a moth in the family Crambidae. It was described by Achille Guenée in 1854. It is found in Haiti, the Dominican Republic, Puerto Rico, Honduras, Panama, Costa Rica and Argentina.
