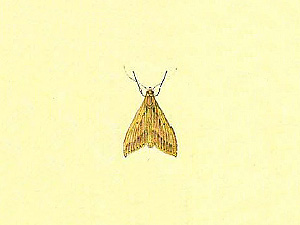

Conservation status
- Critically Endangered (IUCN 3.1)

Scientific classification
- Kingdom: Animalia
- Phylum: Arthropoda
- Class: Insecta
- Order: Lepidoptera
- Family: Crambidae
- Genus: Omiodes
- Species: O. telegrapha

Binomial name
- Omiodes telegrapha Meyrick, 1899

Synonyms
- Hedylepta telegrapha (Meyrick, 1899); Phostria telegrapha

= Omiodes telegrapha =

Telegraphic hedyleptan moth

Species of moth

Omiodes telegrapha, the telegraphic hedyleptan moth, is a species of moth in the family Crambidae. It is endemic to the island of Hawaii.

The larvae probably feed on grasses.

== Sources ==
- Zimmerman, Elwood C. (1958). Insects of Hawaii. Vol. 8 Lepidoptera: Pyraloidea. University of Hawaii Press. hdl:10125/7337.
