= Omiodes anastreptoides =

Scientific classification
- Domain: Eukaryota
- Kingdom: Animalia
- Phylum: Arthropoda
- Class: Insecta
- Order: Lepidoptera
- Family: Crambidae
- Genus: Omiodes
- Species: O. anastreptoides

Binomial name
- Omiodes anastreptoides Swezey, 1913

Synonyms
- Hedylepta anastreptoides; Phostria anastreptoides; Omiodes anastreptoidis

Species of moth

Omiodes anastreptoides is a moth of the family Crambidae. It was described by Otto Herman Swezey in 1913 and is endemic to the island of Hawaii. It was first cited as possibly extinct in 1994 by the U.S. Fish & Wildlife Service. It was listed as extinct by the Hawaiʻi Biological Survey in 2002, but was rediscovered in 2003.

The larvae feed on Carex wahuensis. They feed in spun together leaves of their host plant. Full-grown larvae are 20–25 mm long and grass green.

The pupa is 11–12 mm long and brownish. The pupal period lasts 12–13 days.
