= Omiodes chloromochla =

Scientific classification
- Kingdom: Animalia
- Phylum: Arthropoda
- Class: Insecta
- Order: Lepidoptera
- Family: Crambidae
- Genus: Omiodes
- Species: O. chloromochla

Binomial name
- Omiodes chloromochla (Meyrick, 1936)

Synonyms
- Hedylepta chloromochla Meyrick, 1936

Species of moth

Omiodes chloromochla is a moth in the family Crambidae. It was described by Edward Meyrick in 1936. It is found in the Democratic Republic of the Congo (Equateur, North Kivu, Katanga).
