= Omiodes origoalis =

Scientific classification
- Kingdom: Animalia
- Phylum: Arthropoda
- Class: Insecta
- Order: Lepidoptera
- Family: Crambidae
- Genus: Omiodes
- Species: O. origoalis

Binomial name
- Omiodes origoalis (Walker, 1859)

Synonyms
- Botys origoalis Walker, 1859; Coenostola palliventralis Snellen, 1880

Species of moth

Omiodes origoalis is a moth in the family Crambidae. It was described by Francis Walker in 1859. It is found in Indonesia (Sulawesi, Borneo) and north-eastern India.
