= Omiodes mostella =

Scientific classification
- Kingdom: Animalia
- Phylum: Arthropoda
- Class: Insecta
- Order: Lepidoptera
- Family: Crambidae
- Genus: Omiodes
- Species: O. mostella

Binomial name
- Omiodes mostella (Dyar, 1912)

Synonyms
- Phryganodes mostella Dyar, 1912

Species of moth

Omiodes mostella is a moth in the family Crambidae. It was described by Harrison Gray Dyar Jr. in 1912. It is found in Veracruz, Mexico.
