= Omiodes similis =

Scientific classification
- Kingdom: Animalia
- Phylum: Arthropoda
- Clade: Pancrustacea
- Class: Insecta
- Order: Lepidoptera
- Family: Crambidae
- Genus: Omiodes
- Species: O. similis

Binomial name
- Omiodes similis (Moore, 1885)

Synonyms
- Acharana similis Moore, 1885

Species of moth

Omiodes similis is a moth in the family Crambidae. It was described by Frederic Moore in 1885. It is found in Sri Lanka and China.
