= Omiodes barcalis =

Scientific classification
- Kingdom: Animalia
- Phylum: Arthropoda
- Class: Insecta
- Order: Lepidoptera
- Family: Crambidae
- Genus: Omiodes
- Species: O. barcalis

Binomial name
- Omiodes barcalis (Walker, 1859)

Synonyms
- Botys barcalis Walker, 1859

Species of moth

Omiodes barcalis is a moth in the family Crambidae. It was described by Francis Walker in 1859. It is found on Borneo.
