= Omiodes chrysampyx =

Scientific classification
- Kingdom: Animalia
- Phylum: Arthropoda
- Class: Insecta
- Order: Lepidoptera
- Family: Crambidae
- Genus: Omiodes
- Species: O. chrysampyx

Binomial name
- Omiodes chrysampyx (Turner, 1908)

Synonyms
- Sylepta chrysampyx Turner, 1908

Species of moth

Omiodes chrysampyx is a moth in the family Crambidae. It was described by Turner in 1908. It is found in Australia, where it has been recorded from Queensland.

Adults are black with a white mark on the costa near the apex of the forewings.
