= Omiodes fullawayi =

Fullaway's banana hedyleptan moth

Conservation status
- Data Deficient (IUCN 3.1)

Scientific classification
- Kingdom: Animalia
- Phylum: Arthropoda
- Class: Insecta
- Order: Lepidoptera
- Family: Crambidae
- Genus: Omiodes
- Species: O. fullawayi

Binomial name
- Omiodes fullawayi Swezey, 1913

Synonyms
- Hedylepta fullawayi (Swezey, 1913); Phostria fullawayi

Species of moth

Omiodes fullawayi, Fullaway's banana hedyleptan moth, is a species of moth in the family Crambidae. It was described by Otto Herman Swezey in 1913 and is endemic to the island of Hawaii.

The larvae feed on bananas.

== Sources ==
- Zimmerman, Elwood C. (1958). Insects of Hawaii. Vol. 8 Lepidoptera: Pyraloidea. University of Hawaii Press. hdl:10125/7337.
