= Hawaii Biological Survey =

Natural history inventory program of the Bishop Museum

- Established: 1992
- Location: 1525 Bernice Street, Honolulu, Hawaii, United States
- Coordinates: 21.333411°N 157.871064°W
- Type: Natural History
- Website: hbs.bpbmwebdata.org

The Hawaii Biological Survey (abbreviated as HBS), located on the campus of the Bishop Museum in Honolulu, Hawaii, was created as a program of the Bishop Museum by the Hawaii State legislature in 1992. HBS is an ongoing natural history inventory of the Hawaiian archipelago. It was created to locate, identify, and evaluate all native and non-native fauna and flora within the state, and to maintain the reference collections of that biota for a wide range of uses.

== Collections ==
The Bishop Museum collections are one of the largest in the United States, with more than 23 million specimens and objects. The HBS collections of plants and animals from the Hawaiian Islands total more than 4 million specimens.

== Activities ==
In coordination with related activities in other federal, state, and private agencies, the HBS gathers, analyzes, and disseminates biological information necessary for the wise stewardship of Hawaii’s rich natural heritage.

The HBS conducts a coordinated inventory and monitoring program in assessing the overall status and trends in the abundance, health, and distribution of plants and animals, as well as the ecosystems upon which they depend.

In inventorying the biota of the state, there are approximately 17,000 terrestrial, 500 freshwater, and 5,500 marine species of plants and animals in Hawaii. HBS conducts field surveys to document the distribution of these organisms and is organizing information from its collections and the associated scientific literature into comprehensive computerized databases. This information is used to assist natural resource agencies in the proper management of Hawaii’s rich biota.

== Publications ==
The HBS has published its annual Records of the Hawaii Biological Survey since 1994. This is the primary source of research on new island and state records of Hawaii's fauna and flora.
