= Grass bagworm =

Grass bagworm is a common name for several insects and may refer to:

- Brachycyttarus griseus, native to south-east Asia, including Vietnam, Malaysia, Sabah and the Philippines, and introduced in Guam and Hawaii
- Eurukuttarus confederata, a species of bagworm that only eats grass
- Psyche casta, a nocturnal moth originally from the Old World, but has been introduced in North America
