= Eurukuttarus confederata =

Scientific classification
- Domain: Eukaryota
- Kingdom: Animalia
- Phylum: Arthropoda
- Class: Insecta
- Order: Lepidoptera
- Family: Psychidae
- Genus: Eurukuttarus
- Species: E. confederata

Binomial name
- Eurukuttarus confederata

Species of moth

Eurukuttarus confederata, the grass bagworm, is a species of bagworm that only eats grass. These bagworms make cases less than two cm in length from silk and grass, starting out with a green color, but turning brown as the grass ages.

Since they use vertical surfaces to attach when they pupate, grass bagworms are often seen attached to fences, tree trunks, and the sides of buildings in mid to late June. The grass bagworm emerges from its pupa stage earlier in the season than its tree dwelling cousins. Unlike other bagworms, the grass bagworm inflicts no serious damage to its host grass.
