= Eurukuttarus rotunda =

Scientific classification
- Kingdom: Animalia
- Phylum: Arthropoda
- Class: Insecta
- Order: Lepidoptera
- Family: Psychidae
- Genus: Eurukuttarus
- Species: E. rotunda

Binomial name
- Eurukuttarus rotunda (Hampson, 1893)

Species of moth

Eurukuttarus rotunda is a moth of the family Psychidae first described by George Hampson. It is found in India and Sri Lanka.
