= Eurukuttarus =

Scientific classification
- Kingdom: Animalia
- Phylum: Arthropoda
- Class: Insecta
- Order: Lepidoptera
- Family: Psychidae
- Subfamily: Oiketicinae
- Tribe: Acanthopsychini
- Genus: Eurukuttarus; Hampson, 1891

Genus of moths

Eurukuttarus is a genus of moths belonging to the family Psychidae.

Species:

- Eurukuttarus asiatica Ménétriés
- Eurukuttarus decemvena Hampson, 1892
- Eurukuttarus laniata Hampson, 1905
- Eurukuttarus melanostola Hampson, 1896
- Eurukuttarus nigra Hampson, 1893
- Eurukuttarus pileatus Hampson, 1891
- Eurukuttarus rotunda Hampson
