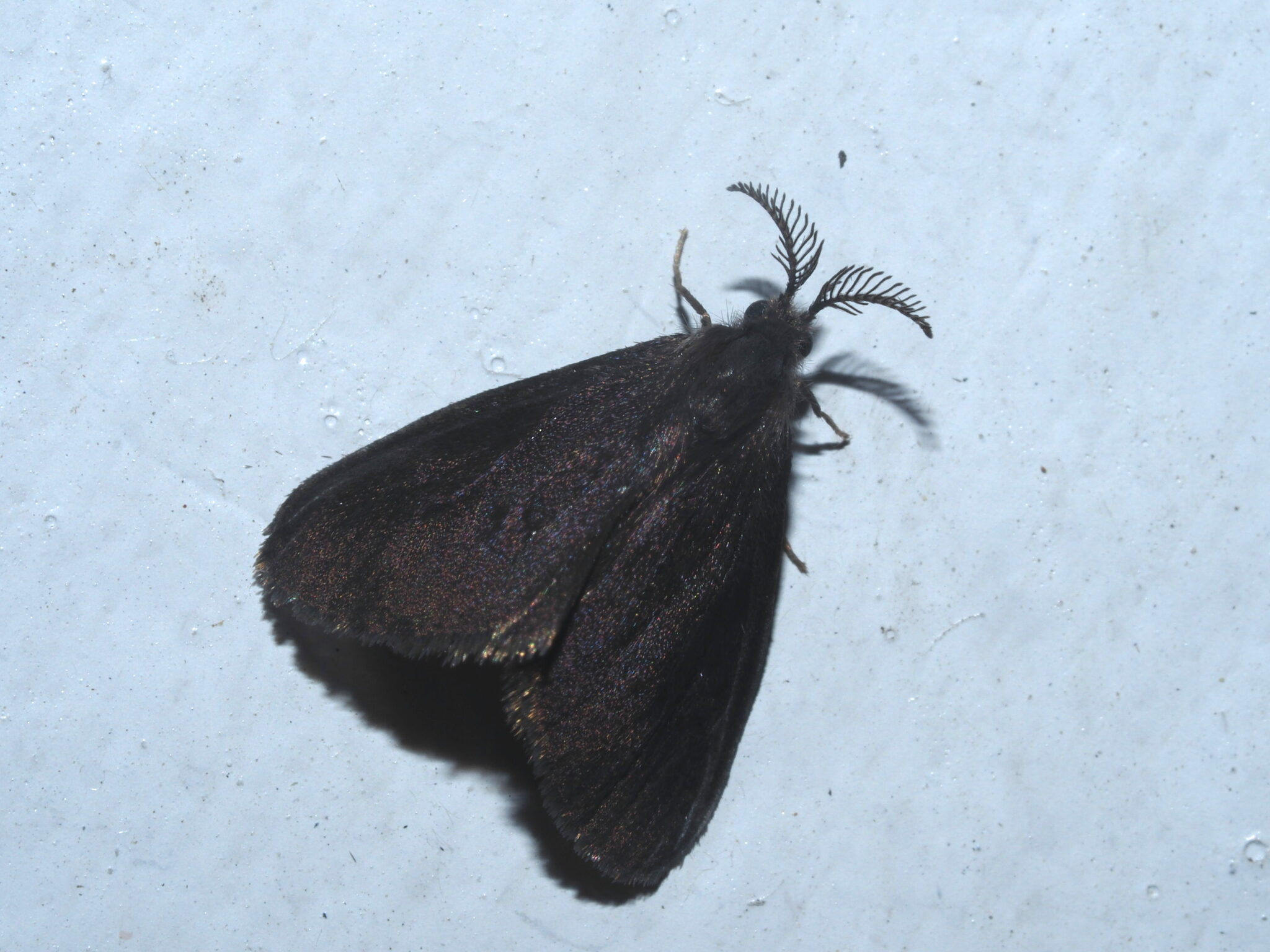
- Adult
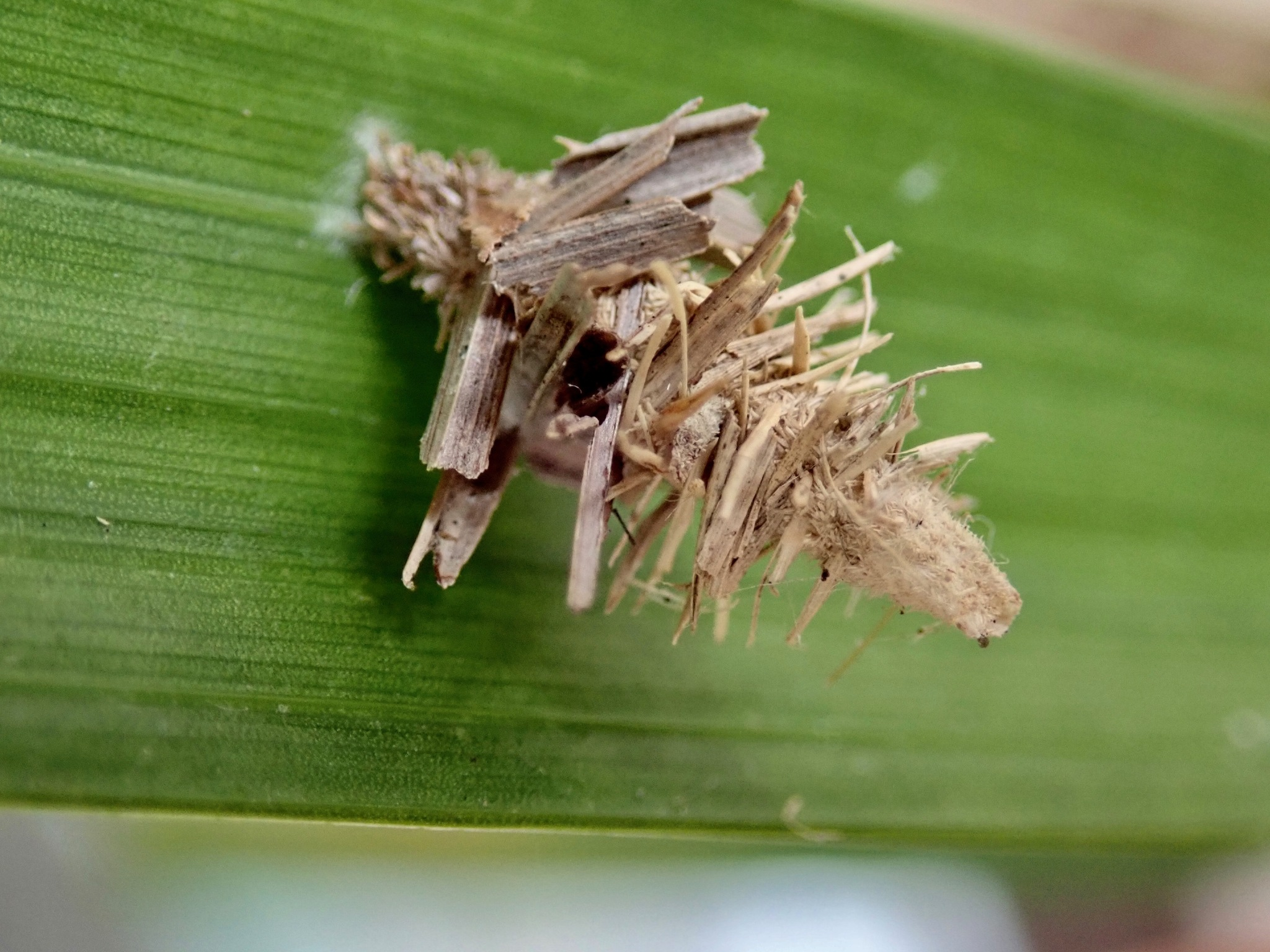
- Pupa

Scientific classification
- Kingdom: Animalia
- Phylum: Arthropoda
- Clade: Pancrustacea
- Class: Insecta
- Order: Lepidoptera
- Family: Psychidae
- Genus: Brachycyttarus
- Species: B. griseus

Binomial name
- Brachycyttarus griseus de Joannis, 1929

Synonyms
- Brachycyttara griseus

= Brachycyttarus griseus =

Species of moth

Brachycyttarus griseus, the grass bagworm, is a moth of the Psychidae family. It is native to south-east Asia, including Vietnam, Malaysia, Sabah and the Philippines, but has been introduced in Guam and Hawaii.
