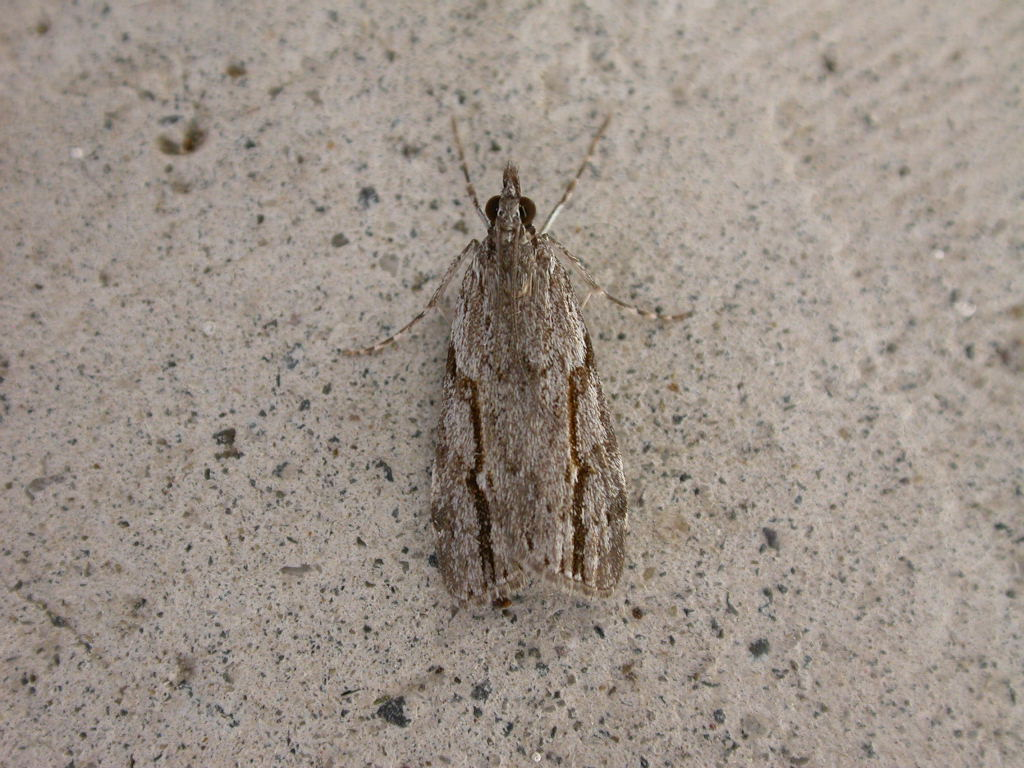

Scientific classification
- Kingdom: Animalia
- Phylum: Arthropoda
- Clade: Pancrustacea
- Class: Insecta
- Order: Lepidoptera
- Family: Crambidae
- Genus: Eudonia
- Species: E. bisinualis

Binomial name
- Eudonia bisinualis (Hudson, 1928)

Synonyms
- Scoparia bisinualis Hudson, 1928

= Eudonia bisinualis =

Species of moth

Eudonia bisinualis is a species of moth in the family Crambidae. It was described by George Vernon Hudson in 1928. This species is endemic to New Zealand.

E. bisinualis has a well marked discal forewing streak and as such has been treated as a separate species. However it has been argued that as this wing patternation is variable, and that this species is outwardly identical in appearance to Eudonia cymatias, and finally that the male genitalia of both these species is identical, they should be regarded as the same species.

Adults are on wing from October to May.
