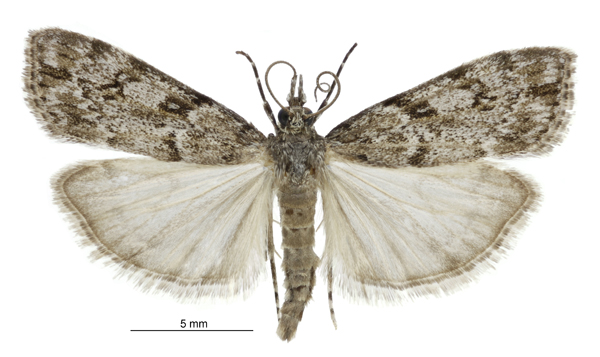
- Male
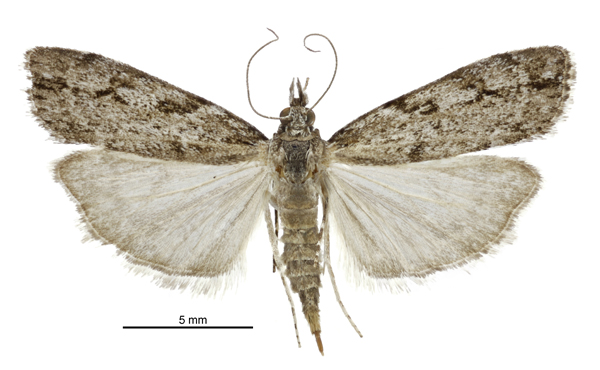
- Female

Scientific classification
- Kingdom: Animalia
- Phylum: Arthropoda
- Class: Insecta
- Order: Lepidoptera
- Family: Crambidae
- Genus: Eudonia
- Species: E. cymatias

Binomial name
- Eudonia cymatias (Meyrick, 1884)

Synonyms
- Scoparia cymatias Meyrick, 1884

= Eudonia cymatias =

Species of moth

Eudonia cymatias is a moth in the family Crambidae. It was named by Meyrick in 1884. This species is endemic to New Zealand.

The wingspan is 21–22 mm. The forewings are fuscous grey, mixed with white and irrorated with black. The hindwings are pale whitish-grey, slightly tinged with ochreous. The postmedian line and a slender hindmarginal suffusion are darker grey. Adults have been recorded on wing in January.
