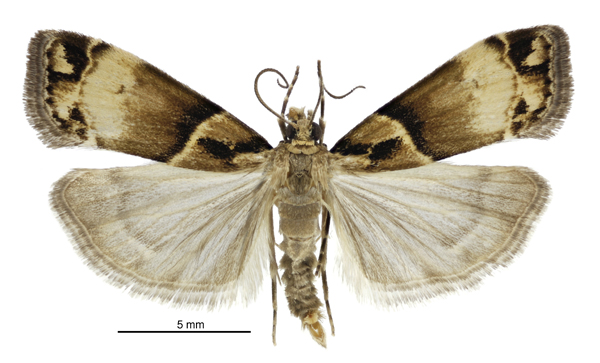
- Male

Scientific classification
- Kingdom: Animalia
- Phylum: Arthropoda
- Class: Insecta
- Order: Lepidoptera
- Family: Crambidae
- Genus: Eudonia
- Species: E. periphanes

Binomial name
- Eudonia periphanes (Meyrick, 1884)

Synonyms
- Scoparia periphanes Meyrick, 1884

= Eudonia periphanes =

Species of moth

Eudonia periphanes is a moth in the family Crambidae. It was named by Edward Meyrick in 1884. Meyrick gave a detailed description of this species in 1885. It is endemic to New Zealand.

The wingspan is about 20 mm. The forewings are grey, slightly brownish-tinged. There is a thick black streak from the base of the costa. The first line is white, margined by black posteriorly. The second line is white, margined by blackish. The hindwings are pale whitish-grey, but the postmedian line and hindmargin are darker grey. Adults have been recorded on wing in January.
