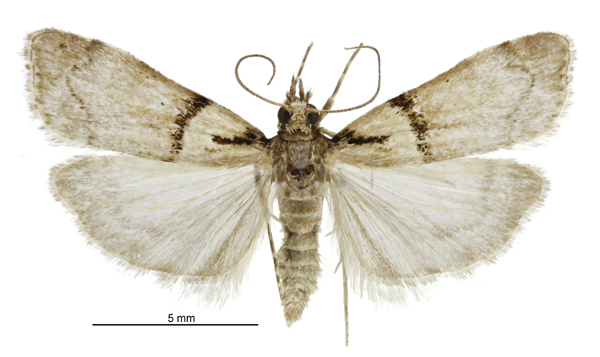

Scientific classification
- Kingdom: Animalia
- Phylum: Arthropoda
- Class: Insecta
- Order: Lepidoptera
- Family: Crambidae
- Genus: Eudonia
- Species: E. colpota

Binomial name
- Eudonia colpota (Meyrick, 1888)

Synonyms
- Scoparia colpota Meyrick, 1888

= Eudonia colpota =

Species of moth

Eudonia colpota is a moth in the family Crambidae. It was described by Edward Meyrick in 1888. It is endemic to New Zealand.

The wingspan is 17–18 mm. The forewings are ochreous-brown in the basal three-fifths, and the terminal two-fifths is light-grey. The hindwings are very pale whitish-grey, with a darker grey postmedian line and hindmargin. Adults have been recorded on wing in January.
