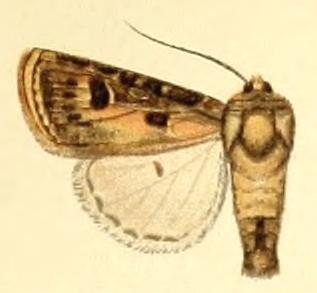

Scientific classification
- Kingdom: Animalia
- Phylum: Arthropoda
- Clade: Pancrustacea
- Class: Insecta
- Order: Lepidoptera
- Superfamily: Noctuoidea
- Family: Noctuidae
- Genus: Agrotis
- Species: A. sabulosa

Binomial name
- Agrotis sabulosa Rambur, 1839

Synonyms
- Euxoa sabulosa

= Agrotis sabulosa =

Species of moth

Agrotis sabulosa is a moth of the family Noctuidae. It is found on the Iberian Peninsula in Europe.

The wingspan is 30–31 mm.

== Description from Seitz ==
Forewing brownish grey, the veins blackish; a blackish blotch before margin above middle: a black streak from base, more irregular than in endogaea Bsd.; claviform large, black: orbicular and reniform both black with grey rings: the cell black between them; hindwing pure white. — Recorded from Andalusia only; it resembles the common exclamationis, but has longer antennal pectinations.
