= Agrotis kinabaluensis =

Scientific classification
- Kingdom: Animalia
- Phylum: Arthropoda
- Clade: Pancrustacea
- Class: Insecta
- Order: Lepidoptera
- Superfamily: Noctuoidea
- Family: Noctuidae
- Genus: Agrotis
- Species: A. kinabaluensis

Binomial name
- Agrotis kinabaluensis Holloway, 1976

Species of moth

Agrotis kinabaluensis is a moth of the family Noctuidae. It is endemic to Borneo.
