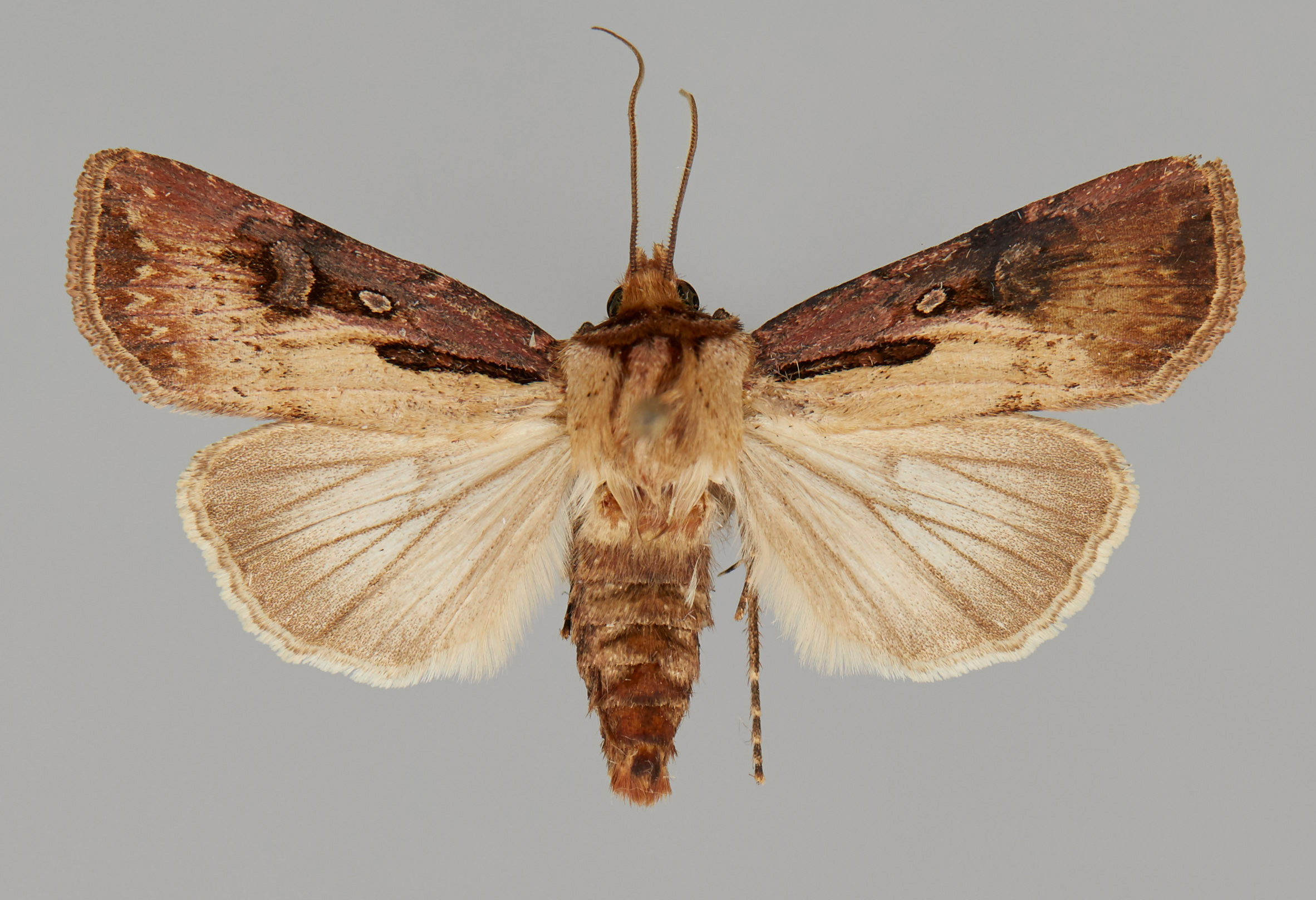

Scientific classification
- Kingdom: Animalia
- Phylum: Arthropoda
- Clade: Pancrustacea
- Class: Insecta
- Order: Lepidoptera
- Superfamily: Noctuoidea
- Family: Noctuidae
- Genus: Agrotis
- Species: A. obliqua

Binomial name
- Agrotis obliqua E. A. Smith, 1903

Synonyms
- Feltia obliqua; Agrotis musa (Smith, 1910)

= Agrotis obliqua =

Species of moth

Agrotis obliqua is a moth of the family Noctuidae first described by Edgar Albert Smith in 1903. It is found in North America from Newfoundland to Vancouver Island, and south to Colorado, Arizona and California.

The wingspan is about 30 mm (1.2 in). Adults are on wing in spring and early summer. There is one generation per year.
