= Agrotis evanescens =

Scientific classification
- Kingdom: Animalia
- Phylum: Arthropoda
- Clade: Pancrustacea
- Class: Insecta
- Order: Lepidoptera
- Superfamily: Noctuoidea
- Family: Noctuidae
- Genus: Agrotis
- Species: A. evanescens

Binomial name
- Agrotis evanescens (Rothschild, 1894)

Synonyms
- Peridroma evanescens Rothschild, 1894; Agrotis eremioides Hampson, 1903

Species of moth

Agrotis evanescens is a moth of the family Noctuidae. It was first described by Walter Rothschild in 1894. It is endemic to the Hawaiian island of Laysan.
