= Agrotis bryani =

Conservation status
- Vulnerable (IUCN 3.1)

Scientific classification
- Kingdom: Animalia
- Phylum: Arthropoda
- Clade: Pancrustacea
- Class: Insecta
- Order: Lepidoptera
- Superfamily: Noctuoidea
- Family: Noctuidae
- Genus: Agrotis
- Species: A. bryani

Binomial name
- Agrotis bryani (Swezey, 1926)

Synonyms
- Euxoa bryani Swezey, 1926

Species of moth

Agrotis bryani is a species of moth in the family Noctuidae. It was first described by Otto Herman Swezey in 1926. It is a vulnerable species endemic to the Hawaiian island of Nīhoa.
