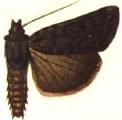

Conservation status
- Endangered (IUCN 3.1)

Scientific classification
- Kingdom: Animalia
- Phylum: Arthropoda
- Clade: Pancrustacea
- Class: Insecta
- Order: Lepidoptera
- Superfamily: Noctuoidea
- Family: Noctuidae
- Genus: Agrotis
- Species: A. epicremna

Binomial name
- Agrotis epicremna Meyrick, 1899

Synonyms
- Euxoa epicremna (Meyrick, 1899)

= Agrotis epicremna =

Species of moth

Agrotis epicremna is a species of moth in the family Noctuidae. Endemic to the Hawaiian Islands, it is known from Kauaʻi, Molokaʻi, and Maui, however, it has not been recorded from Kauaʻi or Molokaʻi since 1981 and 1979 respectively.
