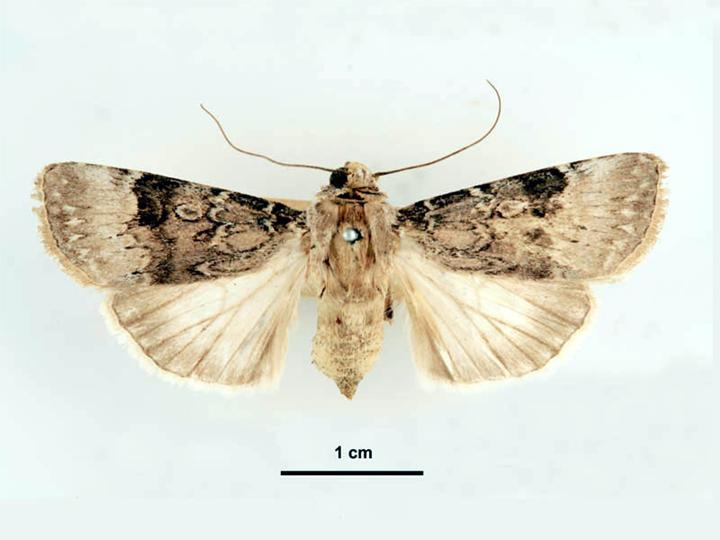

Scientific classification
- Kingdom: Animalia
- Phylum: Arthropoda
- Clade: Pancrustacea
- Class: Insecta
- Order: Lepidoptera
- Superfamily: Noctuoidea
- Family: Noctuidae
- Genus: Agrotis
- Species: A. poliotis

Binomial name
- Agrotis poliotis (Hampson, 1903)

Synonyms
- Euxoa poliotis Hampson, 1903; Euxoa perfusa Warren, 1912; Agrotis bromeana Aurivillius, 1920

= Agrotis poliotis =

Species of moth

Agrotis poliotis is a moth of the family Noctuidae. It is found in the Northern Territory of Queensland and Western Australia.

The larvae have been recorded as sometimes damaging crops.
