= Agrotis dissociata =

Scientific classification
- Kingdom: Animalia
- Phylum: Arthropoda
- Clade: Pancrustacea
- Class: Insecta
- Order: Lepidoptera
- Superfamily: Noctuoidea
- Family: Noctuidae
- Genus: Agrotis
- Species: A. dissociata

Binomial name
- Agrotis dissociata Staudinger, 1899

Moth of the Noctuidae from Chile and Argentina

Agrotis dissociata is a moth of the family Noctuidae. It is found in Punta Arenas and Patagonia in Chile as well as the Neuquén and Mendoza provinces of Argentina.

The wingspan is about 34 mm.
