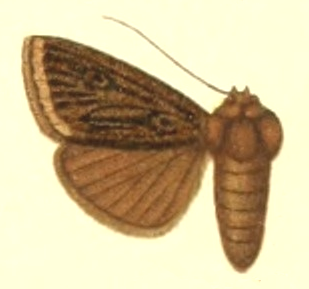

Conservation status
- Least Concern (IUCN 3.1)

Scientific classification
- Kingdom: Animalia
- Phylum: Arthropoda
- Clade: Pancrustacea
- Class: Insecta
- Order: Lepidoptera
- Superfamily: Noctuoidea
- Family: Noctuidae
- Genus: Agrotis
- Species: A. chretieni

Binomial name
- Agrotis chretieni (Dumont, 1903)

Synonyms
- Euxoa chretieni Dumont, 1903; Euxoa chretieni var. lafauryi Dumont, 1920; Euxoa chretieni var. albula Fernández, 1933; Agrotis chretieni pyrenaica Boursin, 1944

= Agrotis chretieni =

Species of moth

Agrotis chretieni is a species of moth in the family Noctuidae. It is found in France and on the Iberian Peninsula.

Adults are on wing from May to June in one generation.

Recorded foodplants include Quercus, Populus alba and Ulex.
