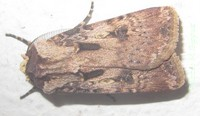

Scientific classification
- Kingdom: Animalia
- Phylum: Arthropoda
- Clade: Pancrustacea
- Class: Insecta
- Order: Lepidoptera
- Superfamily: Noctuoidea
- Family: Noctuidae
- Genus: Agrotis
- Species: A. longidentifera

Binomial name
- Agrotis longidentifera (Hampson, 1903)

Synonyms
- Euxoa longidentifera Hampson, 1903; Agrotis microtica (Hampson, 1908); Euxoa microtica Hampson, 1908; Agrotis ranavalo Viette, 1958

= Agrotis longidentifera =

Species of moth

Agrotis longidentifera, the brown cutworm, is a moth of the family Noctuidae described by George Hampson in 1903. It is found in eastern and southern Africa and several islands in the Indian Ocean.

The adults have a wing length of about 16 mm and the males have largely bipectinate (like a comb on both sides) antennas.

The larvae can cause extensive damage to germinating Zea mays (maize or corn) plants.
