= Agrotis brachypecten =

Scientific classification
- Kingdom: Animalia
- Phylum: Arthropoda
- Clade: Pancrustacea
- Class: Insecta
- Order: Lepidoptera
- Superfamily: Noctuoidea
- Family: Noctuidae
- Genus: Agrotis
- Species: A. brachypecten

Binomial name
- Agrotis brachypecten Hampson, 1899

Synonyms
- Euxoa brachypecten ( Hampson, 1899)

Species of moth

Agrotis brachypecten is a moth of the family Noctuidae. It is found in the Middle East, including Oman and Yemen.
