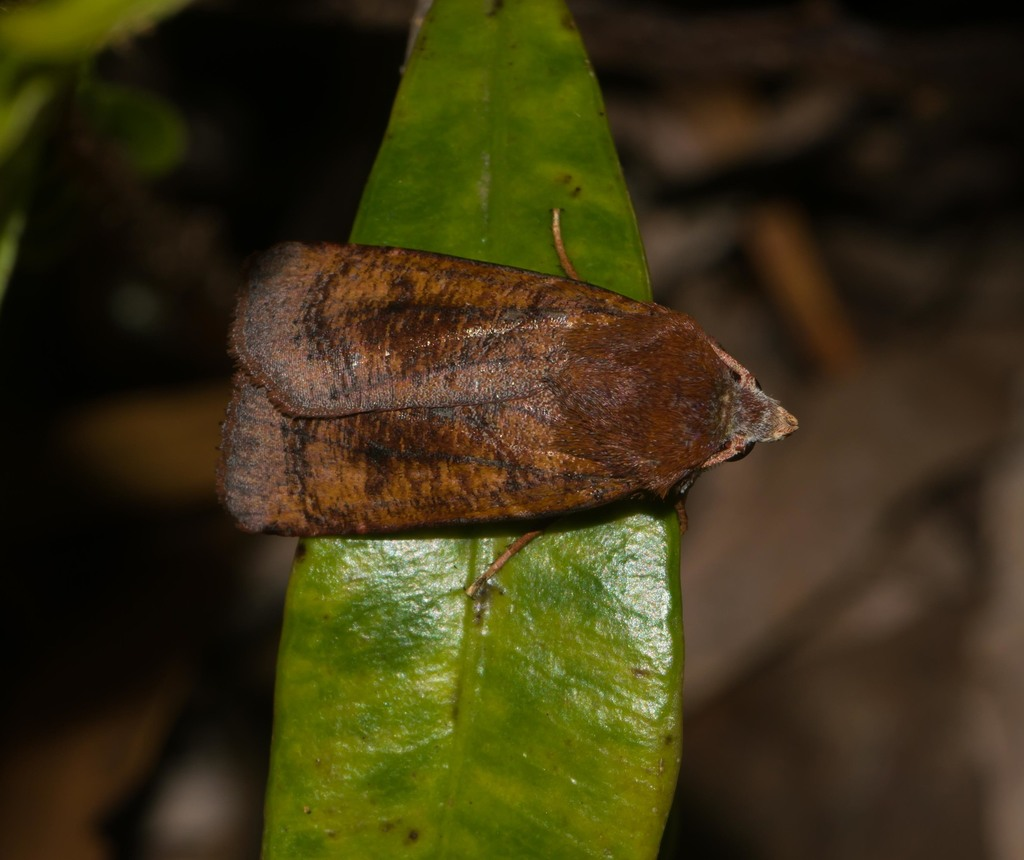

Scientific classification
- Kingdom: Animalia
- Phylum: Arthropoda
- Clade: Pancrustacea
- Class: Insecta
- Order: Lepidoptera
- Superfamily: Noctuoidea
- Family: Noctuidae
- Genus: Agrotis
- Species: A. hephaestaea

Binomial name
- Agrotis hephaestaea (Meyrick, 1899)

Synonyms
- Euxoa hephaestaea Meyrick, 1899; Euxoa diplosticta Hampson, 1909; Euxoa wikstroemiae Swezey, 1920

= Agrotis hephaestaea =

Species of moth

Agrotis hephaestaea is a moth of the family Noctuidae. It was first described by Edward Meyrick in 1899. It is endemic to the Hawaiian islands of Kauai, Oahu and Molokai.

The larvae feed on Wikstroemia species.
