= Agrotis magnipunctata =

Scientific classification
- Kingdom: Animalia
- Phylum: Arthropoda
- Clade: Pancrustacea
- Class: Insecta
- Order: Lepidoptera
- Superfamily: Noctuoidea
- Family: Noctuidae
- Genus: Agrotis
- Species: A. magnipunctata

Binomial name
- Agrotis magnipunctata Prout, 1922

Species of moth

Agrotis magnipunctata is a moth of the family Noctuidae. It is endemic to Buru and Seram.
