= Agrotis hispidula =

Scientific classification
- Kingdom: Animalia
- Phylum: Arthropoda
- Clade: Pancrustacea
- Class: Insecta
- Order: Lepidoptera
- Superfamily: Noctuoidea
- Family: Noctuidae
- Genus: Agrotis
- Species: A. hispidula

Binomial name
- Agrotis hispidula Guenée, 1852

Species of moth

Agrotis hispidula is a moth of the family Noctuidae. It is found from the Valparaíso to the Aisén Region in Chile and the Santa Cruz and Mendoza provinces as well as the Bariloche region of Argentina.

The wingspan is 36–40 mm. Adults are on wing in March.

The larvae feed on various herbaceous plants.
