= Agrotis antica =

Scientific classification
- Kingdom: Animalia
- Phylum: Arthropoda
- Clade: Pancrustacea
- Class: Insecta
- Order: Lepidoptera
- Superfamily: Noctuoidea
- Family: Noctuidae
- Tribe: Noctuini
- Subtribe: Agrotina
- Genus: Agrotis
- Species: A. antica

Binomial name
- Agrotis antica L. G. Crabo & Lafontaine in Lafontaine, 2004

Species of moth

Agrotis antica is a species of cutworm or dart moth in the family Noctuidae. It is found in North America.

The MONA or Hodges number for Agrotis antica is 10660.1.
