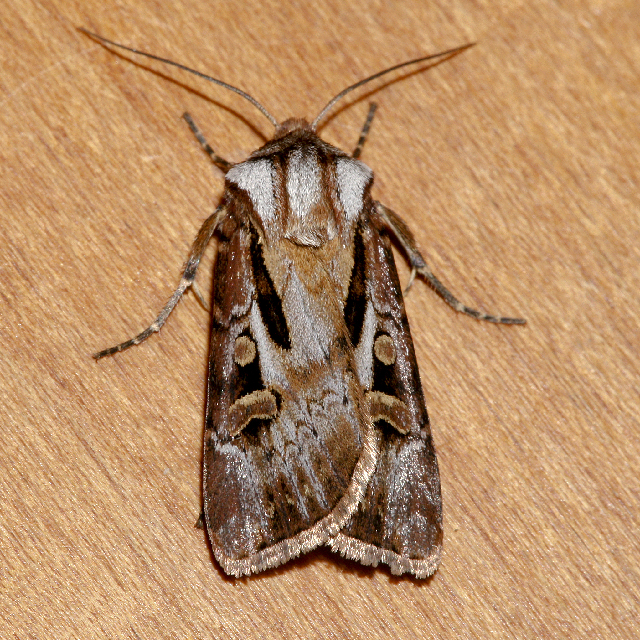

Scientific classification
- Kingdom: Animalia
- Phylum: Arthropoda
- Clade: Pancrustacea
- Class: Insecta
- Order: Lepidoptera
- Superfamily: Noctuoidea
- Family: Noctuidae
- Genus: Agrotis
- Species: A. vancouverensis

Binomial name
- Agrotis vancouverensis Grote, 1873

Synonyms
- Agrotis agilis; Agrotis hortulana; Agrotis aeneipennis Grote, 1876; Agrotis atha Strecker, 1898

= Agrotis vancouverensis =

Vancouver dart

Species of moth

Agrotis vancouverensis, the Vancouver dart, is a moth of the family Noctuidae. The species was first described by Augustus Radcliffe Grote in 1873. It is found in the Pacific Northwest of North America and is common west of the Cascade Mountains.

The length of the forewings is about 33 mm. Adults are on wing in late spring and early summer. There is one generation per year.

The larvae feed on various herbs.

== Subspecies ==
- Agrotis vancouverensis vancouverensis
- Agrotis vancouverensis semiclarata
- Agrotis vancouverensis dentilinea
