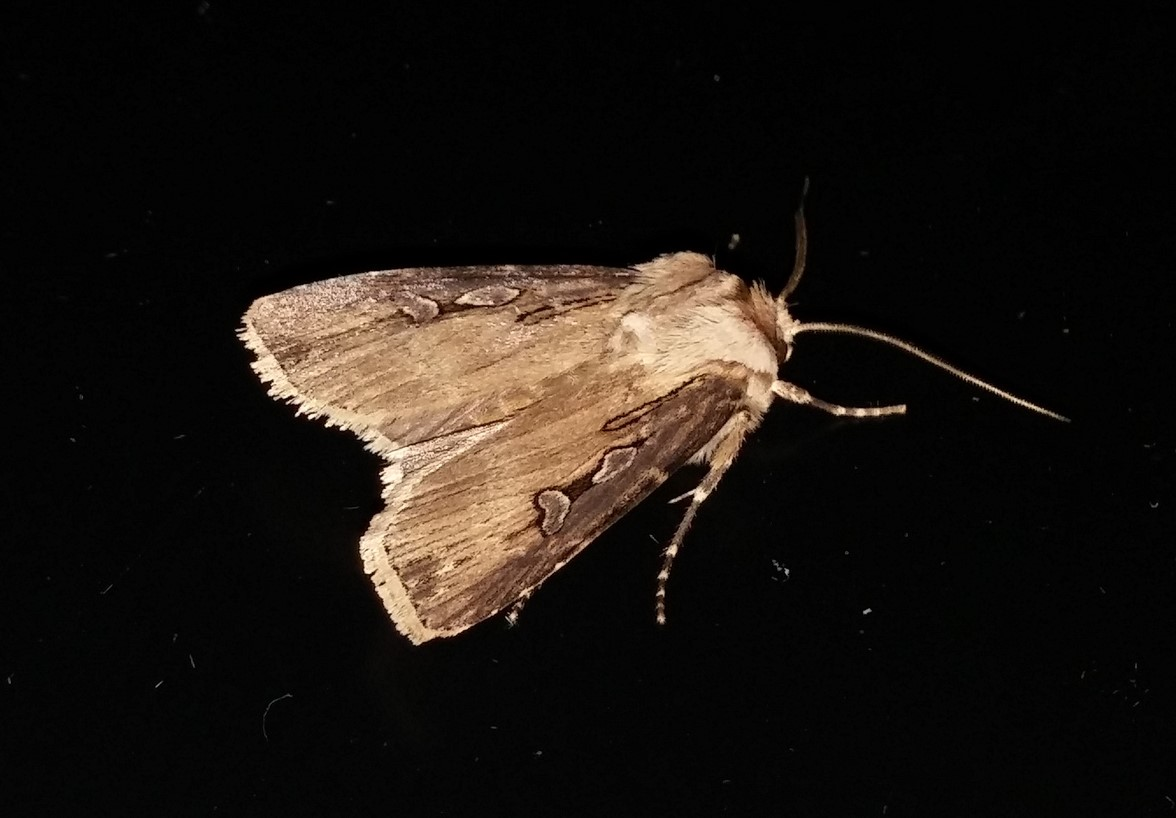

Scientific classification
- Kingdom: Animalia
- Phylum: Arthropoda
- Clade: Pancrustacea
- Class: Insecta
- Order: Lepidoptera
- Superfamily: Noctuoidea
- Family: Noctuidae
- Genus: Agrotis
- Species: A. stigmosa

Binomial name
- Agrotis stigmosa Morrison, 1875

Synonyms
- Agrotis clodiana

= Agrotis stigmosa =

Species of moth

Agrotis stigmosa is a moth of the family Noctuidae first described by Herbert Knowles Morrison in 1875. It is found in North America from New England and Quebec west to Colorado and eastern Alberta. It is listed as a species of special concern in the US state of Connecticut.

The length of the forewings is about 36 mm. Adults are on wing from May to June depending on the location. There is one generation per year.

Larvae have been reared on Achillea, but they likely are generalists who feed on various low-growing herbs.
