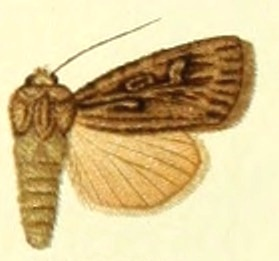

Scientific classification
- Kingdom: Animalia
- Phylum: Arthropoda
- Clade: Pancrustacea
- Class: Insecta
- Order: Lepidoptera
- Superfamily: Noctuoidea
- Family: Noctuidae
- Genus: Agrotis
- Species: A. turbans

Binomial name
- Agrotis turbans Staudinger, 1888

Synonyms
- Euxoa turbans (Staudinger, 1888)

= Agrotis turbans =

Species of moth

Agrotis turbans is a moth of the family Noctuidae. It is found in Uzbekistan.
