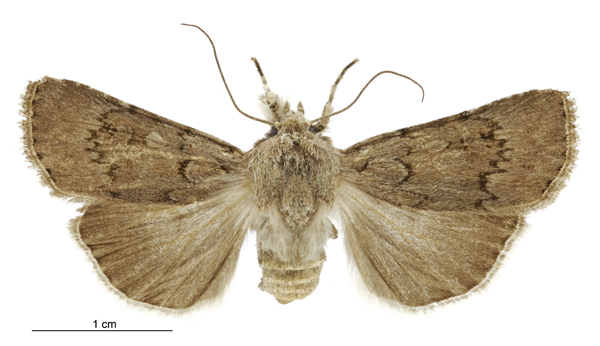
- Female
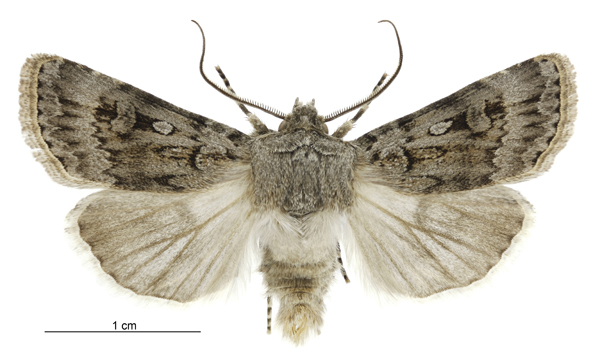
- Male

Scientific classification
- Kingdom: Animalia
- Phylum: Arthropoda
- Clade: Pancrustacea
- Class: Insecta
- Order: Lepidoptera
- Superfamily: Noctuoidea
- Family: Noctuidae
- Genus: Agrotis
- Species: A. admirationis

Binomial name
- Agrotis admirationis Guenée, 1868

Synonyms
- Euxoa admirationis (Guenée, 1868); Chersotis inconspicua Butler, 1880; Euxoa obscura Salmon, 1946; Chersotis sericea Butler, 1879

= Agrotis admirationis =

Species of moth

Agrotis admirationis is a species of moth in the family Noctuidae. It was first described by Achille Guenée in 1868 and is endemic to New Zealand.

== Taxonomy ==
This species was first described by Achille Guenée in 1868 from specimens collected by Richard William Fereday. In 1887 Edward Meyrick redescribed what he thought was this species. George Hudson pointed out in 1898 that Meyrick was describing a new species that Hudson named Agriotis innominata. Hudson discussed and illustrated A. admirationis in his 1928 book The butterflies and moths of New Zealand under the name Euxoa admirationis.

== Description ==
Guenée described this species as follows:

Superior wings smoky-grey, with the ordinary lines much sinuated, blackish and edged with greyish-white atoms; the two median lines very distant, almost parallel; the elbowed line not angulated inferiorily; the three stigmas pale grey encircled with black; the reniform almost touches the elbowed line, and is surrounded by blackish shades; the orbicular very oblong, pyriform, and its apex almost reaching the reniform; the claviform is very oblong and distinct; the sub-terminal line vague; the hinder margin marked with black dots: inferior wings uniformly grey with whitish fringes preceded by vague black dots; beneath they are whiter with a well-marked cellular spot and median shade. Thorax very robust, grey mixed with black, with a blackish line on the anterior part of the collar. The head is darker, and so are the palpi, the last joint of which is long and truncated. Antennae strong, pectinated.

== Distribution and habitat ==
A. admirationis is endemic to New Zealand. This species can be found throughout the North Island and South Island.

This species favoured larval host plants are herbs found in open areas.
