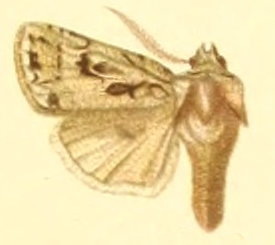

Scientific classification
- Kingdom: Animalia
- Phylum: Arthropoda
- Clade: Pancrustacea
- Class: Insecta
- Order: Lepidoptera
- Superfamily: Noctuoidea
- Family: Noctuidae
- Genus: Agrotis
- Species: A. boetica

Binomial name
- Agrotis boetica (Boisduval, [1837])

Synonyms
- Powellinia boetica (Rambur, [1837])

= Agrotis boetica =

Species of moth

Agrotis boetica is a moth of the family Noctuidae. It is found in the desert regions of North Africa and southern Spain, with its range extending east to Israel.

Adults are on wing from October to November. There is one generation per year.

The larvae feed on Lithospermum, Echinops and Astragalus species.
