= Agrotis ceramophaea =

Conservation status
- Data Deficient (IUCN 3.1)

Scientific classification
- Kingdom: Animalia
- Phylum: Arthropoda
- Clade: Pancrustacea
- Class: Insecta
- Order: Lepidoptera
- Superfamily: Noctuoidea
- Family: Noctuidae
- Genus: Agrotis
- Species: A. ceramophaea

Binomial name
- Agrotis ceramophaea Meyrick, 1899

Synonyms
- Episilia ceramophaea; Rhyacia ceramophaea; Agrotis stenospila Meyrick, 1928

Species of moth

Agrotis ceramophaea is a species of moth in the family Noctuidae. It was described by Edward Meyrick in 1899. It is endemic to the Hawaiian Islands of Kauaʻi, Oʻahu, Maui and Hawaiʻi, however, it has only recently been recorded from Hawai’i and its status on the other islands is uncertain.
