= Agrotis scruposa =

Scientific classification
- Kingdom: Animalia
- Phylum: Arthropoda
- Clade: Pancrustacea
- Class: Insecta
- Order: Lepidoptera
- Superfamily: Noctuoidea
- Family: Noctuidae
- Genus: Agrotis
- Species: A. scruposa

Binomial name
- Agrotis scruposa (Draudt, 1936)

Species of moth

Agrotis scruposa is a moth of the family Noctuidae. It is endemic of the Levant and known only from some localities in Turkey and Israel.

Adults are on wing in July to August. There is one generation per year.
