= Agrotis edmondsi =

Scientific classification
- Kingdom: Animalia
- Phylum: Arthropoda
- Clade: Pancrustacea
- Class: Insecta
- Order: Lepidoptera
- Superfamily: Noctuoidea
- Family: Noctuidae
- Genus: Agrotis
- Species: A. edmondsi

Binomial name
- Agrotis edmondsi Butler, 1882

Synonyms
- Euxoa edmondsi (Butler, 1882)

Species of moth

Agrotis edmondsi is a moth of the family Noctuidae. It is found in the Maule, Biobío and Araucanía regions of Chile.

The wingspan is 32–44 mm. Adults are on wing in March.

The larvae feed on various herbaceous plants.
