= Agrotis giffardi =

Scientific classification
- Kingdom: Animalia
- Phylum: Arthropoda
- Clade: Pancrustacea
- Class: Insecta
- Order: Lepidoptera
- Superfamily: Noctuoidea
- Family: Noctuidae
- Genus: Agrotis
- Species: A. giffardi

Binomial name
- Agrotis giffardi (Swezey, 1932)

Synonyms
- Euxoa giffardi Swezey, 1932

Species of moth

Agrotis giffardi is a moth of the family Noctuidae. It was first described by Otto Herman Swezey in 1932. It is endemic to the island of Hawaii.
