= Agrotis subalba =

Grey cutworm

Scientific classification
- Kingdom: Animalia
- Phylum: Arthropoda
- Clade: Pancrustacea
- Class: Insecta
- Order: Lepidoptera
- Superfamily: Noctuoidea
- Family: Noctuidae
- Genus: Agrotis
- Species: A. subalba

Binomial name
- Agrotis subalba Walker, 1857

Species of moth

Agrotis subalba, the grey cutworm, is a moth of the family Noctuidae. The species was first described by Francis Walker in 1857. It is found in South Africa.

It is considered a pest on Zea mays (corn or maize) and Lycopersicon esculentum (tomato).
