= Agrotis psammocharis =

Scientific classification
- Kingdom: Animalia
- Phylum: Arthropoda
- Clade: Pancrustacea
- Class: Insecta
- Order: Lepidoptera
- Superfamily: Noctuoidea
- Family: Noctuidae
- Genus: Agrotis
- Species: A. psammocharis

Binomial name
- Agrotis psammocharis Boursin, 1950

Species of moth

Agrotis psammocharis is a moth of the family Noctuidae. It is found in the Alborz Mountains in Iran and the Turkestan and Mount Hermon in the Golan Heights.

Adults are on wing in October and they breed once each year.
