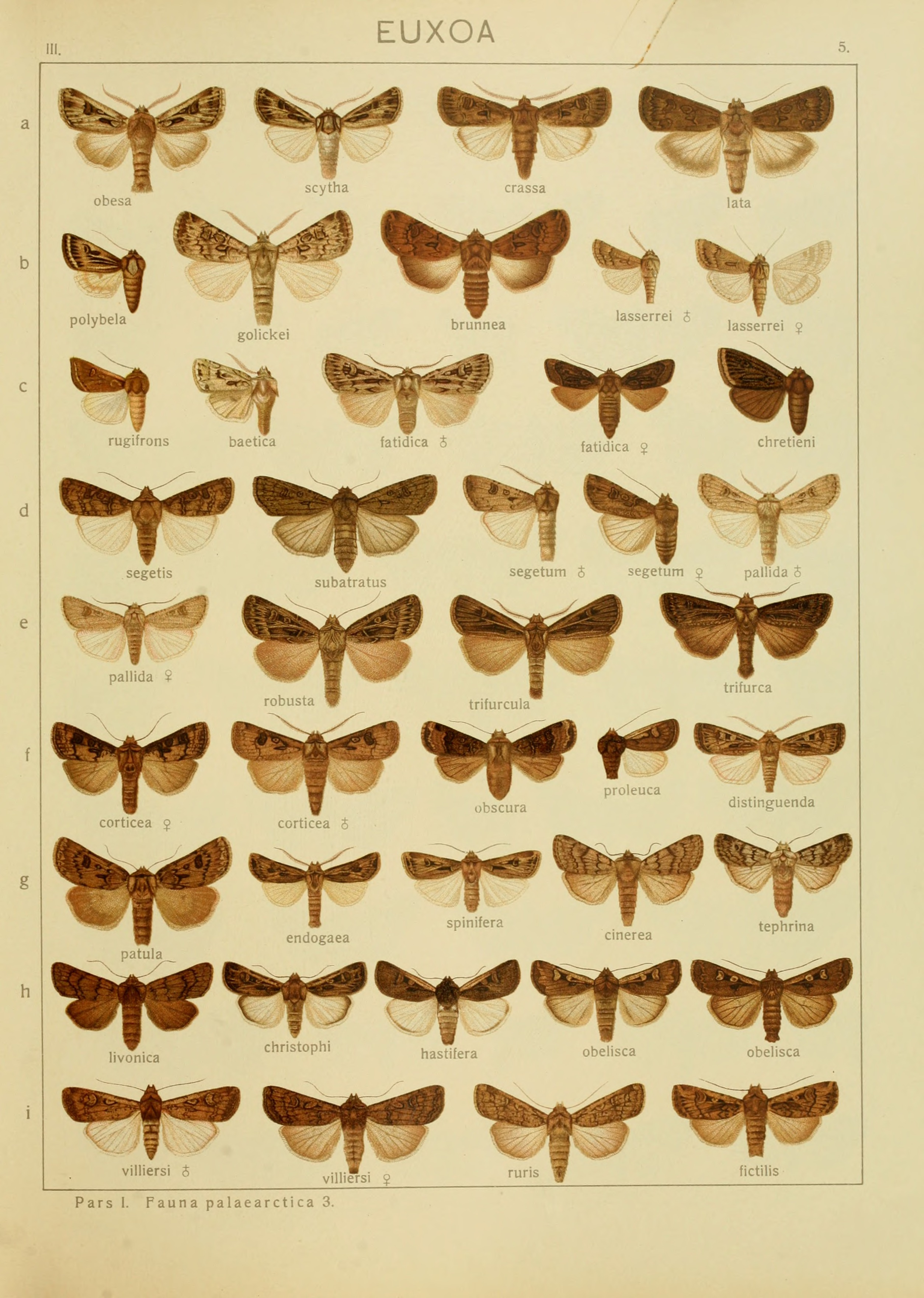
- In Adalbert Seitz' Die Großschmetterlinge der Erde

Scientific classification
- Kingdom: Animalia
- Phylum: Arthropoda
- Clade: Pancrustacea
- Class: Insecta
- Order: Lepidoptera
- Superfamily: Noctuoidea
- Family: Noctuidae
- Genus: Agrotis
- Species: A. lata

Binomial name
- Agrotis lata Treitschke, [1835]

Synonyms
- Agrotis dirempta Staudinger, 1859; Agrotis aflouensis Corti, 1932; Euxoa fulva Turati, 1924; Agrotis castellana Fernández, 1929

= Agrotis lata =

Species of moth

Agrotis lata is a moth of the family Noctuidae. It was described by Georg Friedrich Treitschke in 1835. It is found in Algeria, Egypt, Libya, Morocco, Tunisia, Portugal and Spain, as well as on Sardinia, Sicily and Malta. It has also been recorded from Turkey and possibly Syria and Israel.

The wingspan is 36–44 mm. Adults are on wing in October and November.

== Description from Seitz ==
Forewing pale ochreous, the veins and costal streak greyish white. The ab. lata Tr. (5a) is darker, greyer without the brown tinge [than crassa Hbn. (= huguenini Ruhl)].
