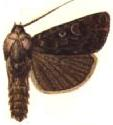

Conservation status
- Endangered (IUCN 3.1)

Scientific classification
- Kingdom: Animalia
- Phylum: Arthropoda
- Clade: Pancrustacea
- Class: Insecta
- Order: Lepidoptera
- Superfamily: Noctuoidea
- Family: Noctuidae
- Genus: Agrotis
- Species: A. baliopa

Binomial name
- Agrotis baliopa Meyrick, 1899

Synonyms
- Euxoa baliopa (Meyrick) Hampson, 1903

= Agrotis baliopa =

Species of moth

Agrotis baliopa is a species of moth in the family Noctuidae. It is an endangered species endemic to the Hawaiian Islands of Maui and Hawaiʻi.
