= Agrotis amphora =

Scientific classification
- Kingdom: Animalia
- Phylum: Arthropoda
- Clade: Pancrustacea
- Class: Insecta
- Order: Lepidoptera
- Superfamily: Noctuoidea
- Family: Noctuidae
- Genus: Agrotis
- Species: A. amphora

Binomial name
- Agrotis amphora Hampson, 1903

Synonyms
- Orosagrotis amphora; Agrotis aimonis Turati, 1933

Species of moth

Agrotis amphora is a species of moth of the family Noctuidae. It is found in Kashmir.
