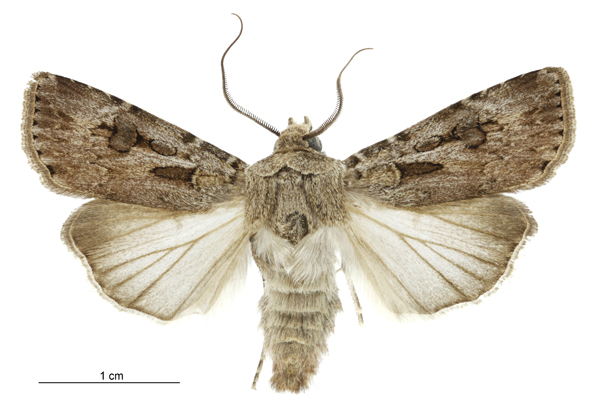
- Male
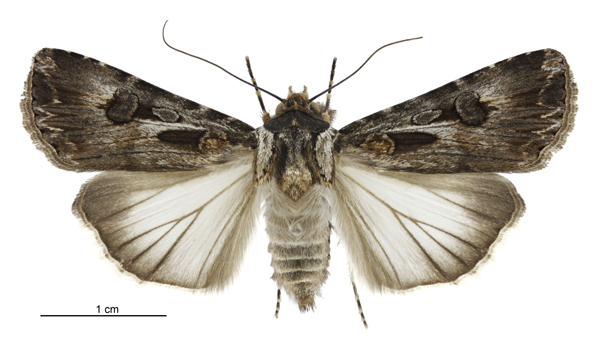
- Female

Scientific classification
- Kingdom: Animalia
- Phylum: Arthropoda
- Clade: Pancrustacea
- Class: Insecta
- Order: Lepidoptera
- Superfamily: Noctuoidea
- Family: Noctuidae
- Genus: Agrotis
- Species: A. munda

Binomial name
- Agrotis munda (Walker, 1857)

Synonyms
- Euxoa injuncta

= Agrotis munda =

Species of moth

Agrotis munda, the brown cutworm or pink cutworm, is a noctuid moth. It is endemic to Australia. It is present in New Zealand.
