= Agrotis gravis =

Scientific classification
- Kingdom: Animalia
- Phylum: Arthropoda
- Clade: Pancrustacea
- Class: Insecta
- Order: Lepidoptera
- Superfamily: Noctuoidea
- Family: Noctuidae
- Genus: Agrotis
- Species: A. gravis

Binomial name
- Agrotis gravis Grote, 1874

Synonyms
- Agrotis vapularis Grote, 1876

Species of moth

Agrotis gravis is a moth of the family Noctuidae. It is found from British Columbia, south to California.

It is only found on sandy ocean beaches, usually with foreshore dunes.
