= Agrotis haifae =

Scientific classification
- Kingdom: Animalia
- Phylum: Arthropoda
- Clade: Pancrustacea
- Class: Insecta
- Order: Lepidoptera
- Superfamily: Noctuoidea
- Family: Noctuidae
- Genus: Agrotis
- Species: A. haifae

Binomial name
- Agrotis haifae Staudinger, 1897

Synonyms
- Agrotis haifae pigmaea Pinker, 1974

Species of moth

Agrotis haifae is a moth of the family Noctuidae. It is found in the eremic zone from North Africa to the Arabian Peninsula.

Adults are on wing from October to April depending on the location. There is one generation per year.
