= Agrotis cremata =

Conservation status
- Critically endangered, possibly extinct (IUCN 3.1)

- Possibly Extinct (NatureServe)

Scientific classification
- Kingdom: Animalia
- Phylum: Arthropoda
- Clade: Pancrustacea
- Class: Insecta
- Order: Lepidoptera
- Superfamily: Noctuoidea
- Family: Noctuidae
- Genus: Agrotis
- Species: A. cremata

Binomial name
- Agrotis cremata (Butler, 1880)

Synonyms
- Spaelotis cremata Butler, 1880; Euxoa cremata (Butler, 1880)

Species of moth

Agrotis cremata is a species of moth in the family Noctuidae. Endemic to the Hawaiian Islands of Maui and Oʻahu, this species was last recorded by Thomas Blackburn prior to his death in 1912, and may now be extinct. The United States Fish and Wildlife Service and NatureServe listed A. cremata as possibly extinct in 1994 and 1998 respectively, while a 2020 assessment for the IUCN Red List assessed it as critically endangered (possibly extinct).
