= Agrotis buchholzi =

Buchholz's dart moth

Scientific classification
- Kingdom: Animalia
- Phylum: Arthropoda
- Clade: Pancrustacea
- Class: Insecta
- Order: Lepidoptera
- Superfamily: Noctuoidea
- Family: Noctuidae
- Genus: Agrotis
- Species: A. buchholzi

Binomial name
- Agrotis buchholzi (Barnes & Benjamin, 1929)

Synonyms
- Agrotis carolina Schweitzer and McCabe, 2004

Species of moth

Agrotis buchholzi, or Buchholz's dart moth, is a species of cutworm or dart moth in the family Noctuidae. It was first described by William Barnes and Foster Hendrickson Benjamin in 1929 and it is found in North America.

The MONA or Hodges number for Agrotis buchholzi is 10654.
