= Agrotis andina =

Scientific classification
- Kingdom: Animalia
- Phylum: Arthropoda
- Clade: Pancrustacea
- Class: Insecta
- Order: Lepidoptera
- Superfamily: Noctuoidea
- Family: Noctuidae
- Genus: Agrotis
- Species: A. andina

Binomial name
- Agrotis andina (Köhler, 1945)

Synonyms
- Euxoa andina Köhler. 1945

Species of moth

Agrotis andina is a moth of the family Noctuidae. It is found in the Maule Region and Biobío Region of Chile as well as the Tucumán Province of Argentina.

The wingspan is 33–36 mm. Adults are on wing from September to April.
