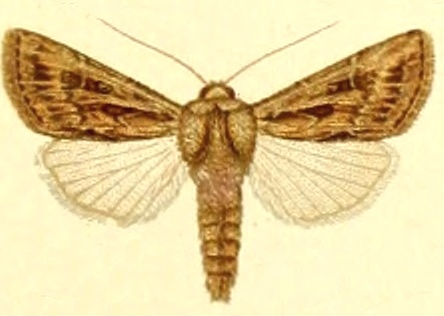

Scientific classification
- Kingdom: Animalia
- Phylum: Arthropoda
- Clade: Pancrustacea
- Class: Insecta
- Order: Lepidoptera
- Superfamily: Noctuoidea
- Family: Noctuidae
- Genus: Agrotis
- Species: A. graslini

Binomial name
- Agrotis graslini Rambur, 1848

Synonyms
- Euxoa graslini Rambur, 1848; Rhyacia atlanta Le Cerf, 1933

= Agrotis graslini =

Woods's dart

Species of moth

Agrotis graslini, or Woods's dart, is a moth of the family Noctuidae. The species was first described by Jules Pierre Rambur in 1848. It is known from coastal dunes in the western Mediterranean region. It was found on Jersey in 2001. Further investigations revealed that the species had been present there since at least 1995.

The wingspan is 35–40 mm.

== Subspecies ==
- Agrotis graslini graslini (France, Channel Islands)
- Agrotis graslini arenosa (Portugal, Spain)
- Agrotis graslini atlanta (Morocco)

== Description from Seitz ==
Forewing pale ochreous, the veins and costal streak greyish white; stigmata distinct; claviform dark, narrow at base, the pale inner line angled below it; orbicular small, flattened, ochreous with centre dark; reniform dark grey with inner edge pale; the cell dark; hindwing white. Restricted to the west coast of France, where the larva is said to feed on the grasses of the sand-dunes.
