= Agrotis melanoneura =

black-veined agrotis noctuid moth

Conservation status
- Extinct (IUCN 2.3)

Scientific classification
- Kingdom: Animalia
- Phylum: Arthropoda
- Clade: Pancrustacea
- Class: Insecta
- Order: Lepidoptera
- Superfamily: Noctuoidea
- Family: Noctuidae
- Genus: Agrotis
- Species: †A. melanoneura

Binomial name
- †Agrotis melanoneura Meyrick, 1899

Synonyms
- Euxoa melanoneura; Agrotis austalea Meyrick, 1899; Euxoa austalea

Extinct species of moth

Agrotis melanoneura (black-veined agrotis noctuid moth) was a moth in the family Noctuidae. It is now an extinct species.

Before its extinction within the last century, it was endemic to Hawaii, United States.

== Sources ==
- 2006 IUCN Red List of Threatened Species.
- Hawaii's Extinct Species - Insects
- Fauna Hawaiiensis
