= Agrotis alticaffer =

Scientific classification
- Kingdom: Animalia
- Phylum: Arthropoda
- Clade: Pancrustacea
- Class: Insecta
- Order: Lepidoptera
- Superfamily: Noctuoidea
- Family: Noctuidae
- Genus: Agrotis
- Species: A. alticaffer

Binomial name
- Agrotis alticaffer Krüger, 2005

Species of moth

Agrotis alticaffer is a moth of the family Noctuidae first described by Krüger in 2005. It is endemic to Lesotho.
