= Agrotis margelanoides =

Scientific classification
- Kingdom: Animalia
- Phylum: Arthropoda
- Clade: Pancrustacea
- Class: Insecta
- Order: Lepidoptera
- Superfamily: Noctuoidea
- Family: Noctuidae
- Genus: Agrotis
- Species: A. margelanoides

Binomial name
- Agrotis margelanoides (Boursin, 1944)

Synonyms
- Powellinia margelanoides (Boursin, 1944)

Species of moth

Agrotis margelanoides is a moth of the family Noctuidae. It is only known from the Levant, Iraq, Saudi Arabia and Bahrain.

Adults are on wing in autumn. There is one generation per year.
