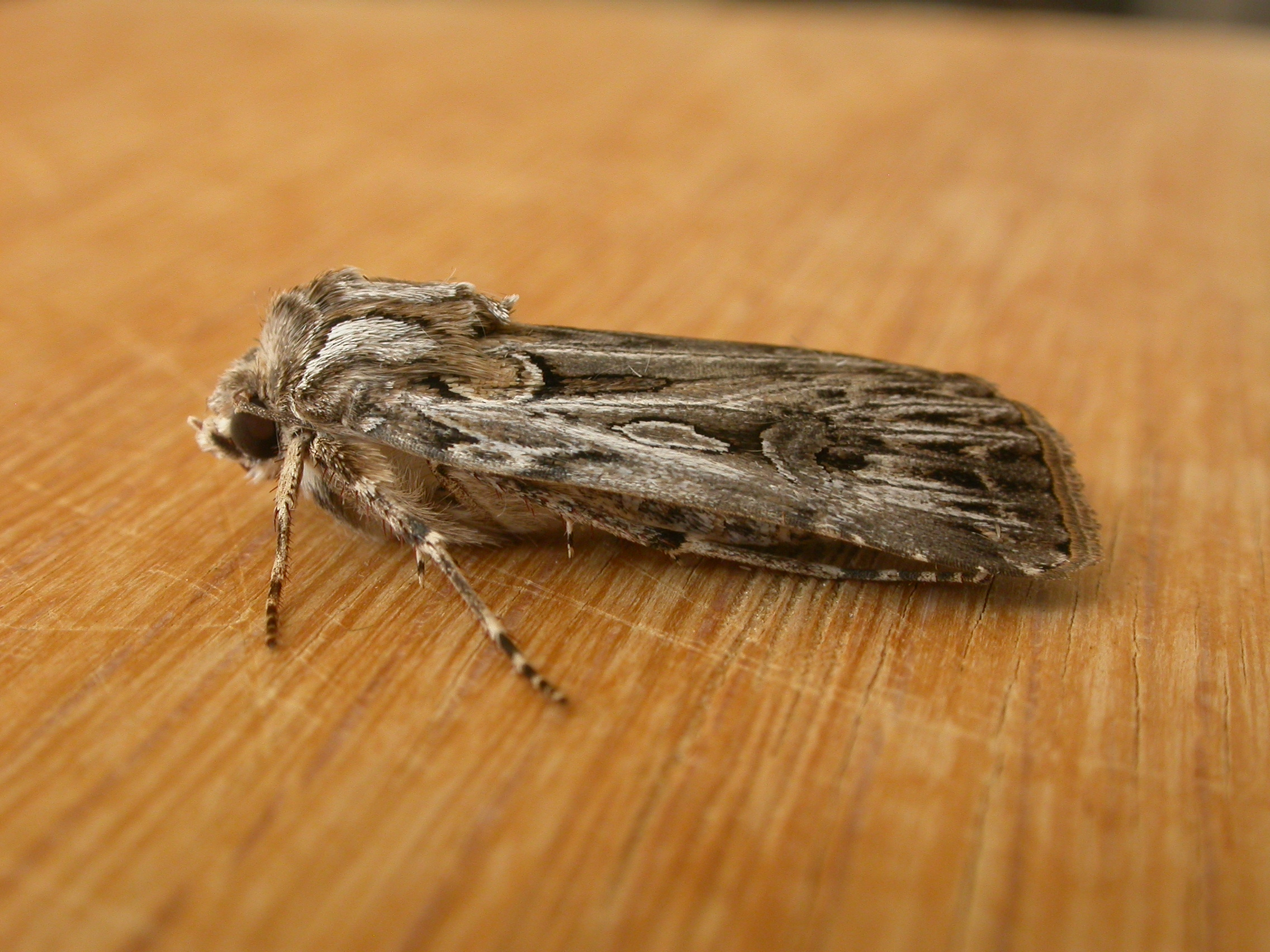

Scientific classification
- Kingdom: Animalia
- Phylum: Arthropoda
- Clade: Pancrustacea
- Class: Insecta
- Order: Lepidoptera
- Superfamily: Noctuoidea
- Family: Noctuidae
- Genus: Agrotis
- Species: A. radians

Binomial name
- Agrotis radians Guénée, 1852

Synonyms
- Euxoa repanda Walker, 1857; Euxoa radians

= Agrotis radians =

Species of moth

Agrotis radians (brown cutworm) is a moth of the family Noctuidae. It is found in the Australian Capital Territory, Queensland, New South Wales and Tasmania.

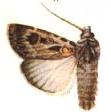
Illustration

The wingspan is about 40 mm.

The larvae feed on Portulaca oleracea and a wide range of crops, such as Zea mays, Triticium, Nicotiana tabacum, Lycopersicon, Gossypium, Medicago sativum, Pinus and Pseudotsuga menziesii.
