= Agrotis tephrias =

Kauaʻi agrotis noctuid moth

Conservation status
- Extinct (IUCN 2.3)

Scientific classification
- Kingdom: Animalia
- Phylum: Arthropoda
- Clade: Pancrustacea
- Class: Insecta
- Order: Lepidoptera
- Superfamily: Noctuoidea
- Family: Noctuidae
- Genus: Agrotis
- Species: †A. tephrias

Binomial name
- †Agrotis tephrias Meyrick, 1899

Synonyms
- Euxoa tephrias; Agrotis spoderopa Meyrick, 1899; Euxoa spoderopa

Extinct species of moth

Agrotis tephrias, or the Kauaʻi agrotis noctuid moth, was a moth in the family Noctuidae. It is now an extinct species.

Before its extinction within the last century, it was endemic to Kauaʻi, Hawaii, United States.

== Sources ==
- 2006 IUCN Red List of Threatened Species.
- Hawaii's Extinct Species - Insects
