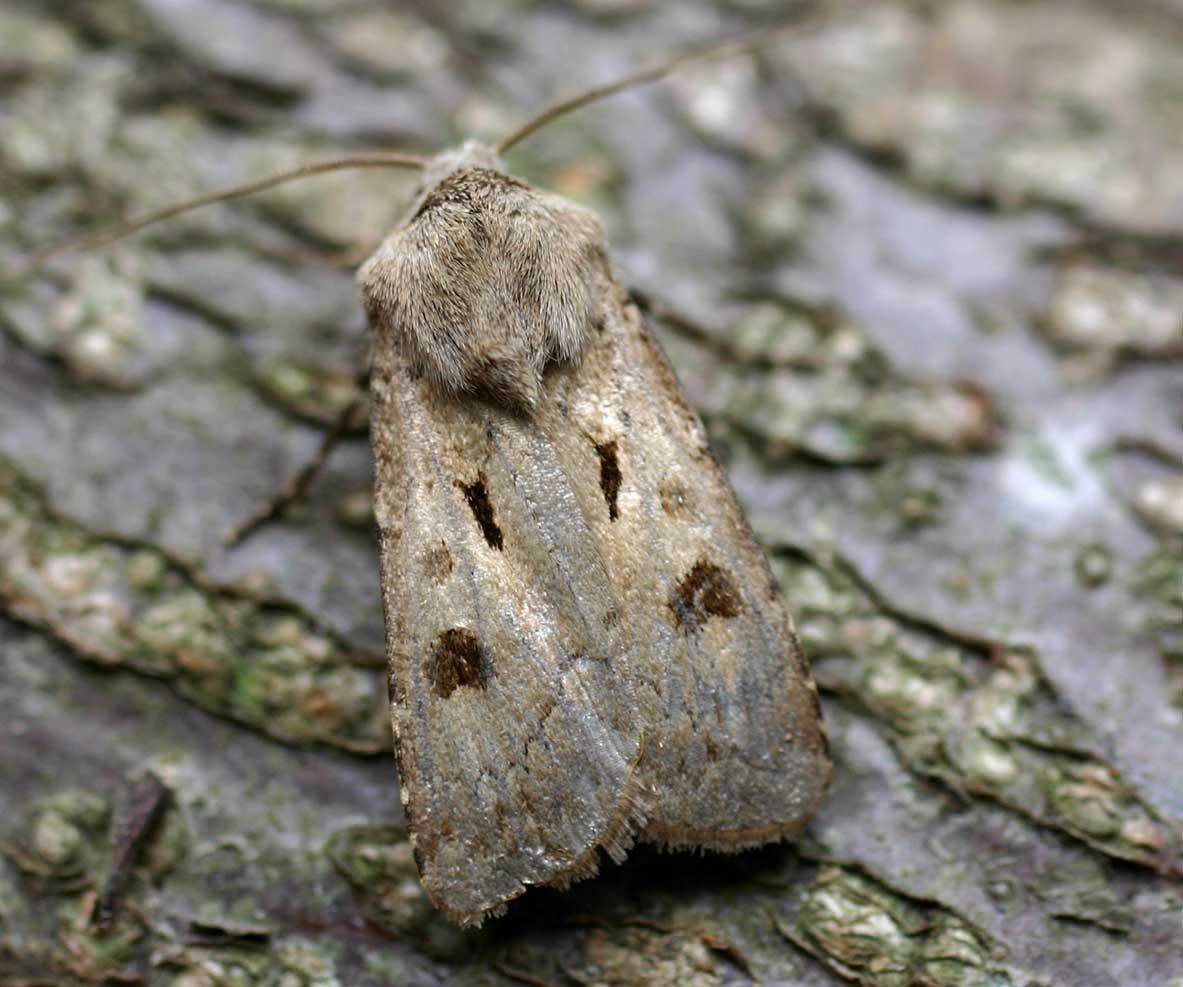
- Heart and dart, Agrotis exclamationis

Scientific classification
- Kingdom: Animalia
- Phylum: Arthropoda
- Class: Insecta
- Order: Lepidoptera
- Superfamily: Noctuoidea
- Family: Noctuidae
- Subtribe: Agrotina
- Genus: Agrotis; Ochsenheimer, 1816

Synonyms
- Onychagrotis Hampson, 1903

= Agrotis =

Genus of moths

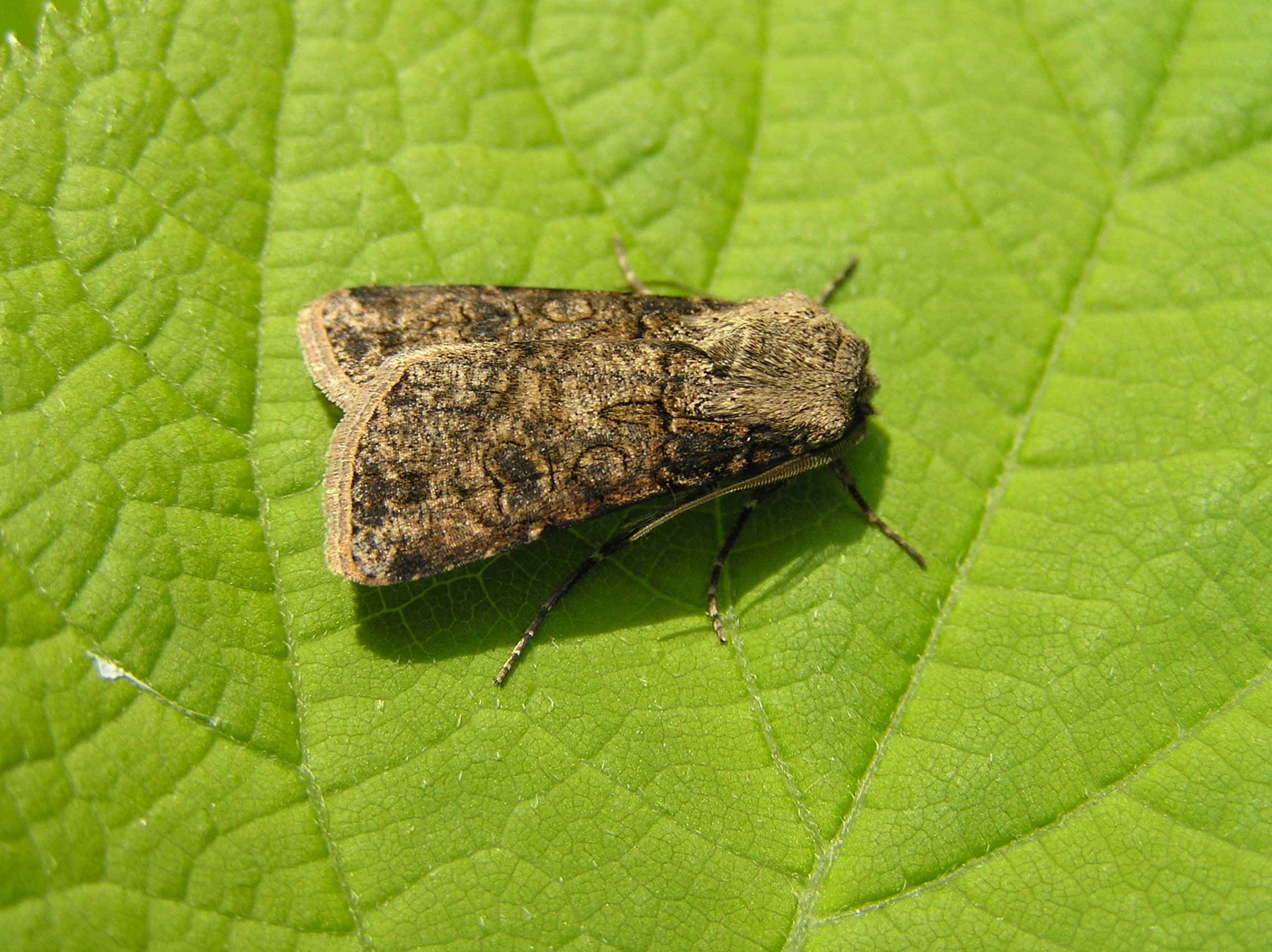
Agrotis clavis resting on a leaf

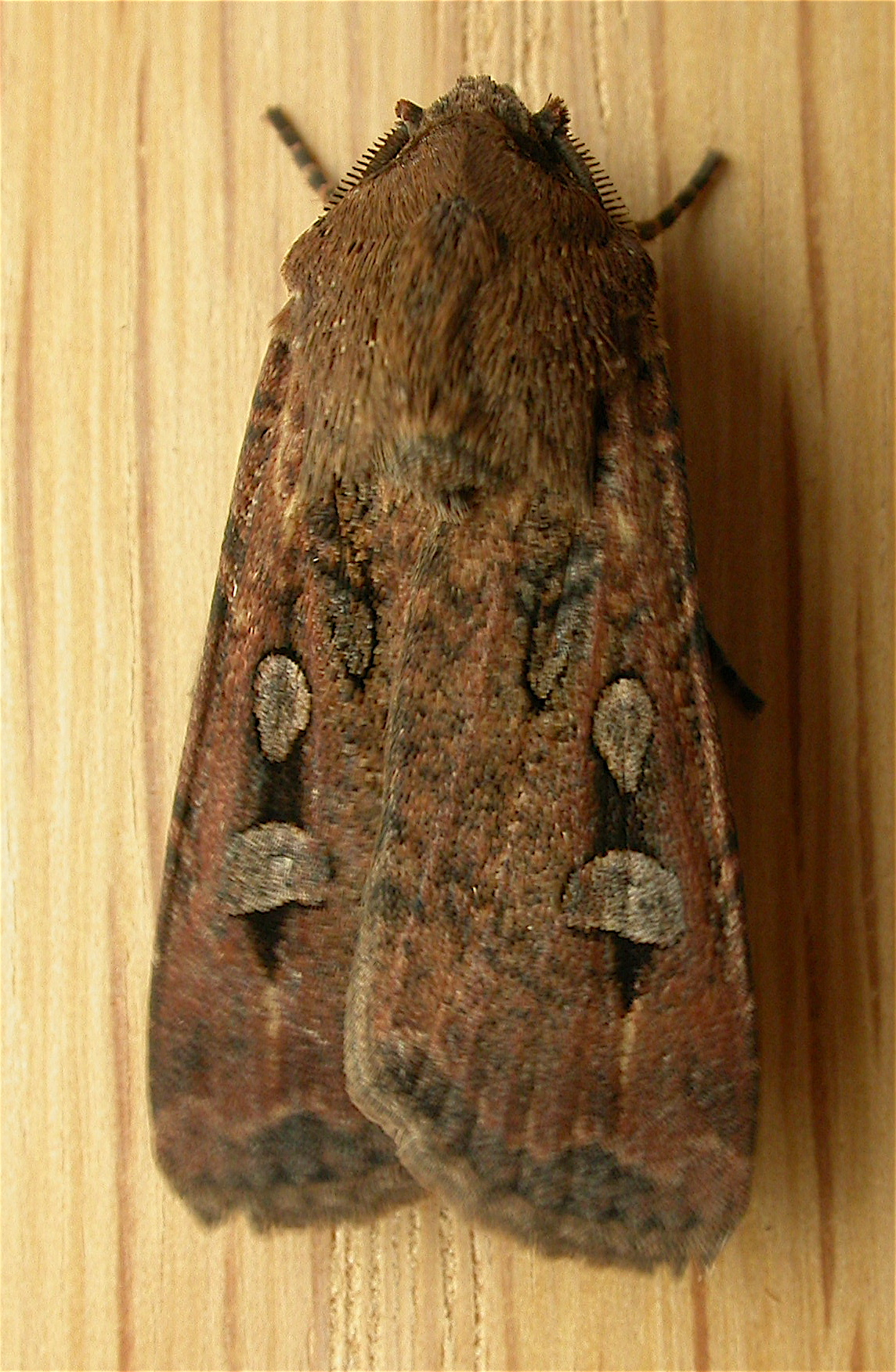
Bogong moth, Agrotis infusa

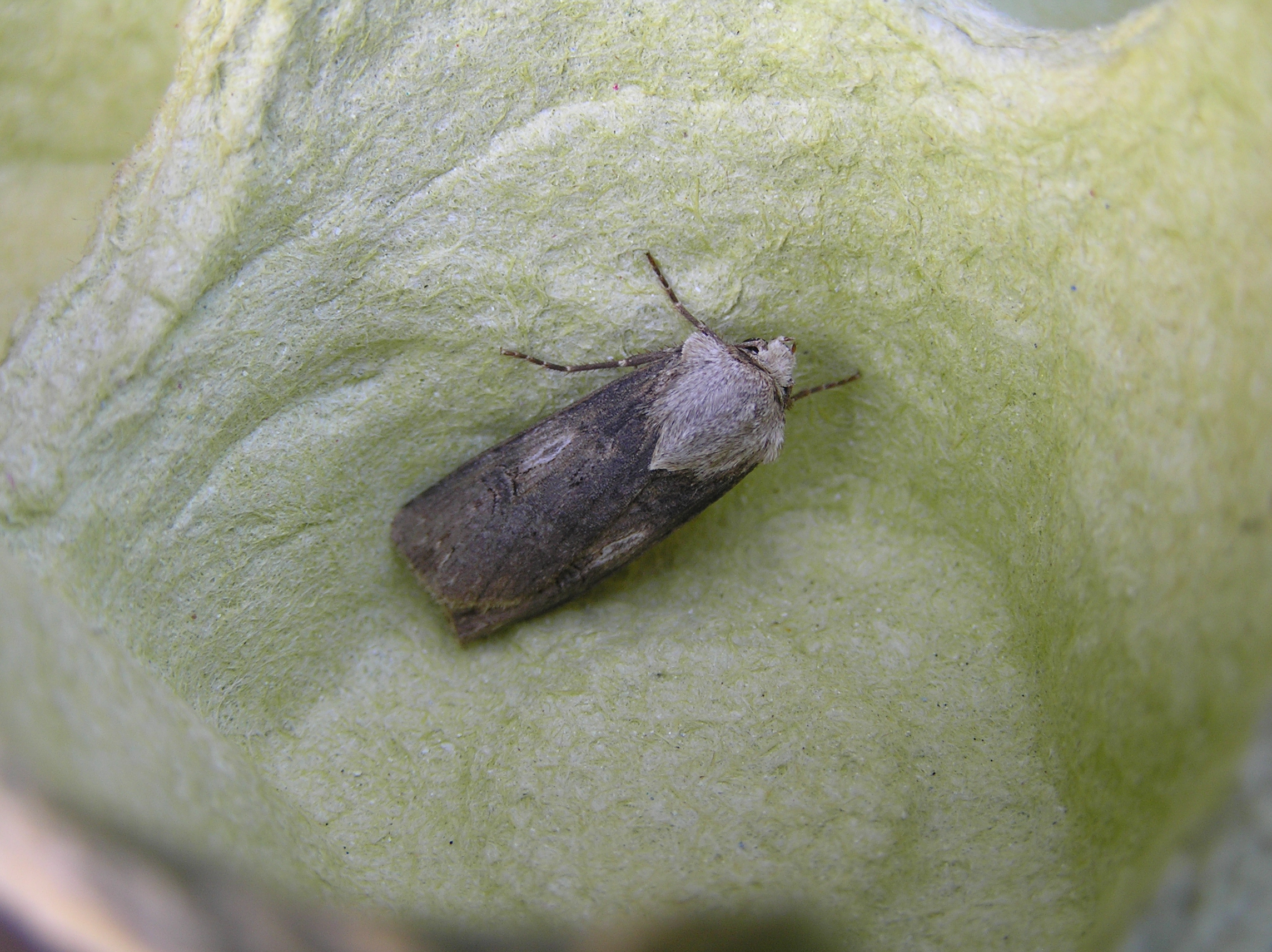
Agrotis puta

Agrotis is a genus of moths of the family Noctuidae. The genus was erected by Ferdinand Ochsenheimer in 1816. A number of the species of this genus are extinct.

== Description ==
The proboscis is well developed. Palpi obliquely porrect (extending forward), where the second joint evenly scaled and third joint prominent. Thorax and abdomen without tufts. Abdomen somewhat flattened. Tibia very strongly spined. Forewings with non-crenulate outer margin. Hindwings with veins 3 and 4 from cell.

== Ecology ==
Many of the species are of great importance as cutworms, major agricultural pests whose larvae hide by day and emerge at night to feed. The name cutworm refers to the habit of the larvae, of cutting down and partly eating garden and crop plants, especially seedlings. Not all cutworms are in the genus Agrotis, though it may well be the genus that includes the largest number of cutworm species, and the most agriculturally important cutworm species.

The bogong moth, itself a cutworm, also has been of importance as a seasonal food for humans, valued by indigenous Australians.

== Species ==
- Agrotis admirationis Guenée, 1868
- Agrotis alexandriensis Baker, 1894
- Agrotis alpestris Boisduval, 1837
- Agrotis alticaffer Krüger, 2005
- Agrotis altivagans (Varga, 1979)
- Agrotis antica Crabo & Lafontaine, 2004
- Agrotis apicalis Herrich-Schäffer, 1868
- Agrotis amphora Hampson, 1903
- Agrotis andina (Köhler, 1945)
- Agrotis araucaria (Hampson, 1903)
- Agrotis arenarius Neil, 1983
- Agrotis arenivolans Butler, 1879
- Agrotis atrux Pinker, 1971
- Agrotis aulacias Meyrick, 1899
- Agrotis baliopa Meyrick, 1899
- Agrotis bilitura Guenée, 1852
- Agrotis bigramma (Esper, 1790)
- Agrotis boetica (Boisduval, 1837)
- Agrotis bosqui (Köhler, 1945)
- Agrotis brachystria (Hampson 1903)
- Agrotis brachypecten Hampson, 1899
- Agrotis bryani Swezey, 1926
- Agrotis buchholzi Barnes & Benjamin, 1929 (syn: Agrotis carolina Schweitzer & McCabe, 2004)
- Agrotis caffer (Hampson, 1903)
- Agrotis canities (Grote, 1902)
- Agrotis ceramophaea Meyrick, 1899
- Agrotis characteristica Alphéraky, 1892
- Agrotis charmocrita (Meyrick, 1928)
- Agrotis chretieni Dumont, 1903
- Agrotis cinerea Denis & Schiffermüller, 1775 – light feathered rustic moth
- Agrotis clavis Hufnagel, 1766 – heart-and-club moth
- Agrotis consentanea Mabille, 1880
- Agrotis coquimbensis (Hampson, 1903)
- Agrotis crassa Hübner, 1803
- †Agrotis cremata Butler, 1880 – Maui agrotis noctuid moth
- †Agrotis crinigera Butler, 1881 – poko noctuid moth, larger Hawaiian cutworm moth
- Agrotis cursoriodes (Hampson, 1903)
- Agrotis daedalus Smith, 1890
- Agrotis desertorum Boisduval, 1840
- Agrotis dislocata Walker, 1856
- Agrotis dissociata Staudinger, 1899
- Agrotis edmondsi Butler, 1882
- Agrotis emboloma Lower, 1918
- Agrotis endogaea Boisduval, 1837
- Agrotis epicremna Meyrick, 1899
- Agrotis evanescens Rothschild 1894
- Agrotis exclamationis Linnaeus, 1758 – heart-and-dart moth
- Agrotis experta (Walker, 1869)
- †Agrotis fasciata Hübner, 1824 – Midway noctuid moth
- Agrotis fatidica Hübner, 1824
- Agrotis fortunata Draudt, 1938
- Agrotis frosya Pekarsky, 2014 TL: Bering Island
- Agrotis giffardi (Swezey, 1932)
- Agrotis gladiaria Morrison, 1875 – swordsman dart moth, clay-backed cutworm moth
- Agrotis graslini Rambur, 1848
- Agrotis gravis Grote, 1874
- Agrotis gypaetina Guenée, 1852
- Agrotis haesitans Walker, 1857
- Agrotis haifae Staudinger, 1897
- Agrotis hephaestaea (Meyrick, 1899)
- Agrotis herzogi Rebel, 1911
- Agrotis hispidula Guenée, 1852
- Agrotis incognita Staudinger, 1888
- Agrotis inconsequens Rothschild, 1920
- Agrotis infusa Boisduval, 1832 – bogong
- Agrotis innominata Hudson, 1898
- Agrotis interjectionis Guénée, 1852
- Agrotis ipsilon Hufnagel, 1766 – ipsilon dart moth, dark sword-grass moth
- Agrotis iremeli Nupponen, Ahola & Kullberg, 2001
- †Agrotis kerri Swezey, 1920 – Kerr's noctuid moth
- Agrotis kinabaluensis Holloway, 1976
- Agrotis kingi McDunnough, 1932
- Agrotis lanzarotensis Rebel, 1894 (syn: Agrotis selvagensis Pinker & Bacallado, 1978)
- Agrotis lasserrei (Oberthür, 1881)
- Agrotis lata Treitschke, 1835
- †Agrotis laysanensis Rothschild, 1894 – Laysan noctuid moth
- Agrotis longicornis Lafontaine & Troubridge, 2004
- Agrotis longidentifera (Hampson, 1903)
- Agrotis luehri Mentzer & Moberg, 1987
- Agrotis magnipunctata Prout, 1922
- Agrotis malefida Guénée, 1852 – rascal dart moth, pale-sided cutworm moth
- Agrotis manifesta Morrison, 1875
- Agrotis margelanoides (Boursin, 1944)
- †Agrotis melanoneura Meyrick, 1899 – black-veined agrotis noctuid moth
- Agrotis mayrorum Ronkay & Huemer, 2018
- Agrotis mazeli Ronkay & Huemer, 2018
- Agrotis mesotoxa Meyrick, 1899
- †Agrotis microreas Meyrick, 1899
- Agrotis militaris Staudinger, 1888 (syn: Rhyacia furushonis Matsumura, 1925)
- Agrotis mollis Walker, 1857
- Agrotis munda Walker, 1857 – brown cutworm moth, pink cutworm moth
- Agrotis obesa Boisduval, 1829
- Agrotis obliqua Smith, 1903
- Agrotis orthogonia Morrison, 1876 – pale western cutworm moth
- †Agrotis panoplias Meyrick, 1899 – Kona agrotis noctuid moth
- Agrotis patricei Viette, 1959
- Agrotis perigramma Meyrick, 1899
- †Agrotis photophila Butler, 1879 – light-loving noctuid moth
- Agrotis pierreti (Bugnion, 1837)
- Agrotis plumiger Krüger, 2005
- Agrotis poliophaea Turner, 1926
- Agrotis poliotis Hampson, 1903
- Agrotis porphyricollis Guénée, 1852 – variable cutworm moth
- †Agrotis procellaris Meyrick, 1900
- Agrotis psammocharis Boursin, 1950
- Agrotis psammophaea Meyrick, 1899
- Agrotis puta Hübner, 1803 – shuttle-shaped dart moth
- Agrotis radians Guénée, 1852
- Agrotis rileyana (Morrison, 1875)
- Agrotis ripae Hübner, 1823 – sand dart moth
- Agrotis robustior Smith, 1899
- Agrotis ruta Eversmann, 1851
- Agrotis sabulosa Rambur, 1839
- Agrotis sardzeana Brandt, 1941
- Agrotis schawerdai Bytinski-Salz, 1937
- Agrotis scruposa (Draudt, 1936)
- Agrotis segetum Denis & Schiffermüller, 1775 – turnip moth
- Agrotis sesamioides Rebel, 1907
- Agrotis simplonia Geyer, 1832
- Agrotis spinifera Hübner, 1808 – Gregson's dart moth
- Agrotis stenibergmani (Bryk, 1941) (syn: Rhyacia stenibergmani poverina Bryk, 1942)
- Agrotis stigmosa Morrison, 1875
- Agrotis striata Lafontaine, 2004
- Agrotis subalba Walker, 1857
- Agrotis submolesta Püngeler, [1899] 1900
- Agrotis syricola Corti & Draudt, 1933
- Agrotis taiwana B.S.Chang, 1991
- Agrotis talda (Schaus & Clements, 1893)
- †Agrotis tephrias Meyrick, 1899 – Kauai agrotis noctuid moth
- Agrotis trifurca Eversmann, 1837
- Agrotis trifurcula Staudinger, 1892
- Agrotis trux Hübner, 1824
- Agrotis turatii Standfuss, 1888
- Agrotis turbans Staudinger, 1888
- Agrotis vancouverensis Grote, 1873 – Vancouver dart moth
- Agrotis venerabilis Walker, 1857 – venerable dart moth, dusky cutworm moth
- Agrotis vestigialis Hufnagel, 1766 – archer's dart
- Agrotis vetusta Walker, 1865 – old man dart moth, spotted-legged cutworm moth, muted dart moth
- Agrotis villosus Alphéraky, 1887
- Agrotis volubilis Harvey, 1874 – voluble dart moth
- Agrotis xiphias Meyrick, 1899
- Agrotis yelai Fibiger, 1990

=== Until recently placed here ===
- Agrotis dolli is now Eucoptocnemis dolli (Grote, 1882)
- Agrotis repleta is now Feltia repleta (Walker, 1857)
- Agrotis subterranea – tawny shoulder, granulate cutworm is now Feltia subterranea (Fabricius, 1794)
