= Agrotis caffer =

Scientific classification
- Kingdom: Animalia
- Phylum: Arthropoda
- Clade: Pancrustacea
- Class: Insecta
- Order: Lepidoptera
- Superfamily: Noctuoidea
- Family: Noctuidae
- Genus: Agrotis
- Species: A. caffer

Binomial name
- Agrotis caffer (Hampson, 1903)

Species of moth

Agrotis caffer is a moth of the family Noctuidae first described by George Hampson in 1903. It is endemic to Lesotho and South Africa.
