= Agrotis xiphias =

Scientific classification
- Kingdom: Animalia
- Phylum: Arthropoda
- Clade: Pancrustacea
- Class: Insecta
- Order: Lepidoptera
- Superfamily: Noctuoidea
- Family: Noctuidae
- Genus: Agrotis
- Species: A. xiphias

Binomial name
- Agrotis xiphias Meyrick, 1899

Synonyms
- Feltia xiphias; Euxoa xiphias; Euxoa xiphias ab. rufescens Warren, 1912; Feltia xiphias ab. xiphioides Strand, 1916

Species of moth

Agrotis xiphias is a moth of the family Noctuidae. It was first described by Edward Meyrick in 1899. It is endemic to the Hawaiian islands of Kauai and Maui.

It is a distinctively marked species whose pattern is subject to considerable variation.
