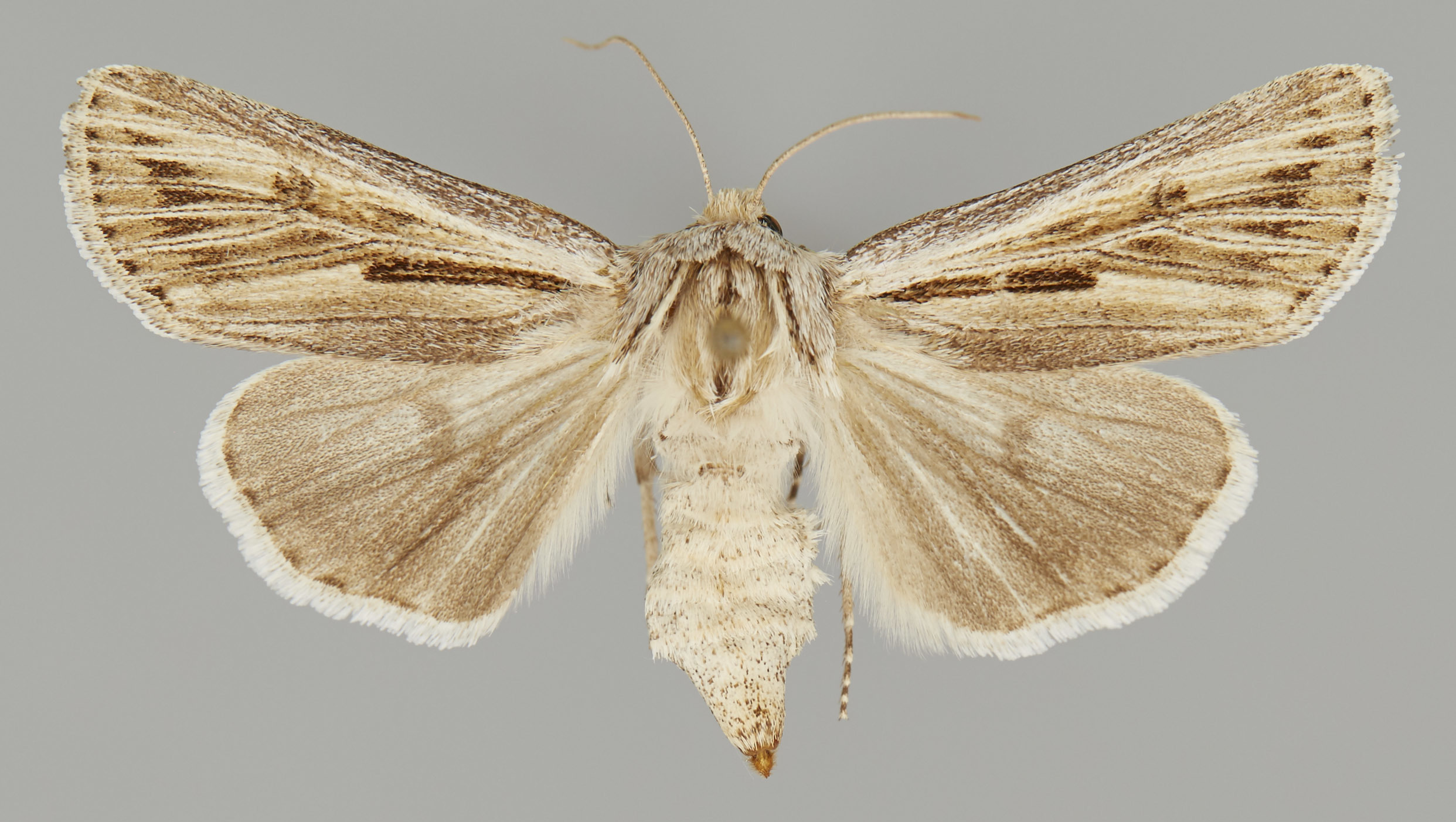

Scientific classification
- Kingdom: Animalia
- Phylum: Arthropoda
- Clade: Pancrustacea
- Class: Insecta
- Order: Lepidoptera
- Superfamily: Noctuoidea
- Family: Noctuidae
- Genus: Agrotis
- Species: A. daedalus

Binomial name
- Agrotis daedalus Smith, 1890

Synonyms
- Porosagrotis daedalus

= Agrotis daedalus =

Species of moth

Agrotis daedalus is a species of moth in the family Noctuidae. It is found throughout the Great Plains, from west Texas, New Mexico and Arizona west to northern Nevada north to southern Alberta and south central Saskatchewan.

The wingspan is about 38 mm. Adults are on wing in early spring. There is one generation per year.
