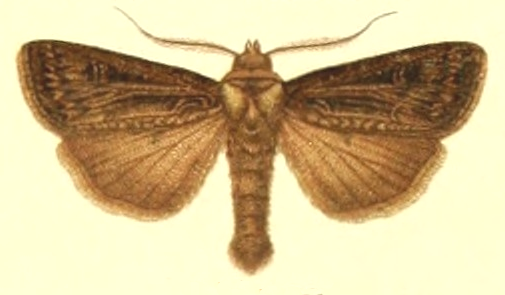

Scientific classification
- Kingdom: Animalia
- Phylum: Arthropoda
- Clade: Pancrustacea
- Class: Insecta
- Order: Lepidoptera
- Superfamily: Noctuoidea
- Family: Noctuidae
- Genus: Agrotis
- Species: A. trifurca

Binomial name
- Agrotis trifurca Eversmann, 1837

Synonyms
- Euxoa trifurca; Agrotis atra Corti & Draudt, 1837

= Agrotis trifurca =

Species of moth

Agrotis trifurca is a moth of the family Noctuidae. It is found in Turkestan, Siberia, south-eastern Ukraine, the Altai Mountains, Tibet, China, Mongolia, the Amur region and the Korean Peninsula. It is also found in the eastern Carpathian Mountains in Romania.
