= Agrotis arenivolans =

Conservation status
- Endangered (IUCN 3.1)

Scientific classification
- Kingdom: Animalia
- Phylum: Arthropoda
- Clade: Pancrustacea
- Class: Insecta
- Order: Lepidoptera
- Superfamily: Noctuoidea
- Family: Noctuidae
- Genus: Agrotis
- Species: A. arenivolans

Binomial name
- Agrotis arenivolans Butler, 1879

Synonyms
- Euxoa arenivolans (Butler) Hampson, 1903

Species of moth

Agrotis arenivolans is a species of moth in the family Noctuidae. It is an endangered species endemic to the Hawaiian Islands of Maui and Hawaiʻi, however, it may now be extirpated from Hawaiʻi.
