= Agrotis experta =

Scientific classification
- Kingdom: Animalia
- Phylum: Arthropoda
- Clade: Pancrustacea
- Class: Insecta
- Order: Lepidoptera
- Superfamily: Noctuoidea
- Family: Noctuidae
- Genus: Agrotis
- Species: A. experta

Binomial name
- Agrotis experta (Walker, 1869)

Synonyms
- Laphygma experta Walker, 1869; Laphygma innotabilis Walker, 1869

Species of moth

Agrotis experta is a moth of the family Noctuidae. It is found in the Tarapacá and Antofagasta regions of Chile and the Callao District of Peru.

The wingspan is 40–60 mm. Adults are on wing from April to October.

The larvae have been recorded on beet, sesame, alfalfa, cotton, kidney bean, Solanum tuberosum and tobacco.
