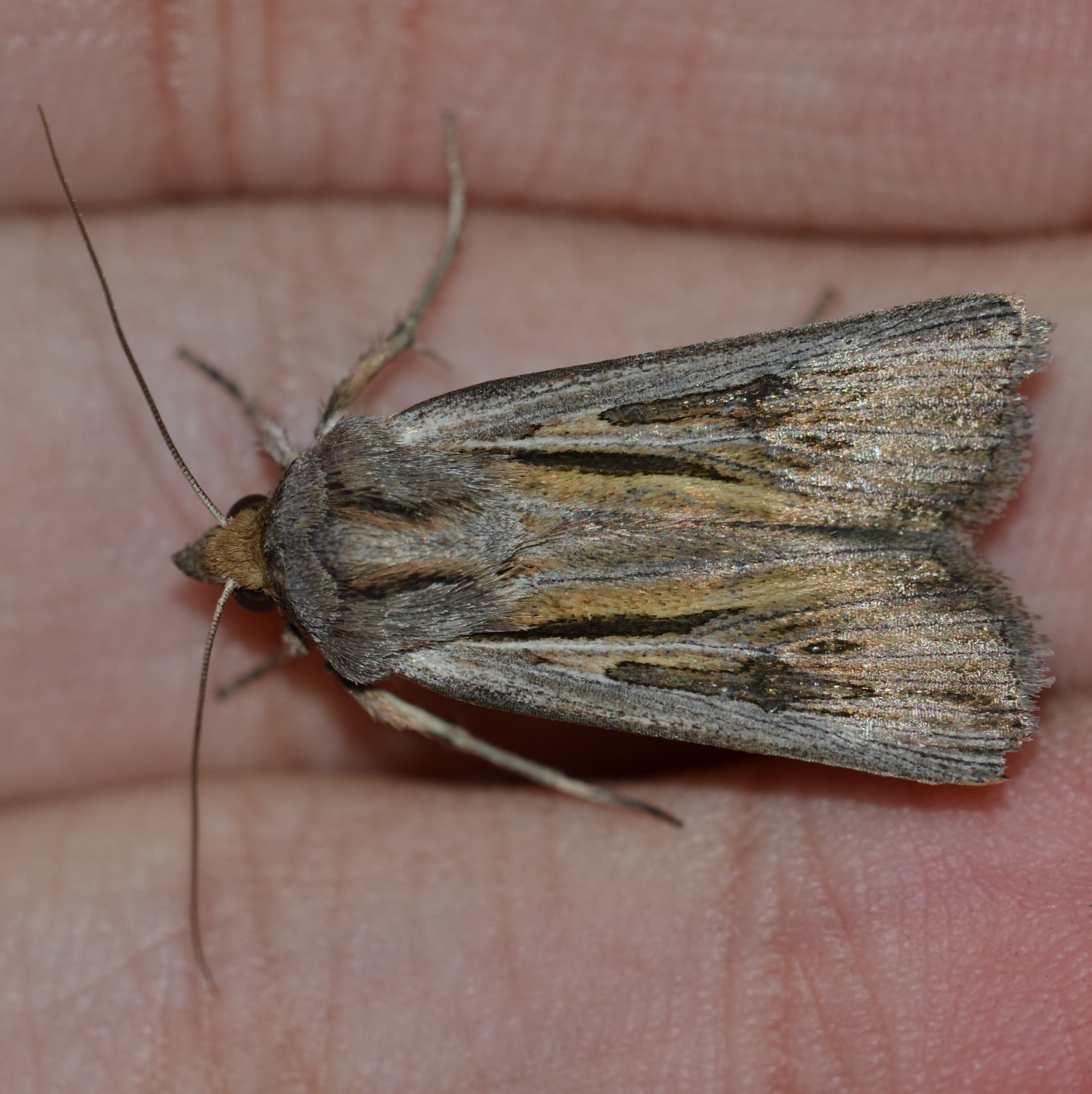

Conservation status
- Data Deficient (IUCN 3.1)

Scientific classification
- Kingdom: Animalia
- Phylum: Arthropoda
- Clade: Pancrustacea
- Class: Insecta
- Order: Lepidoptera
- Superfamily: Noctuoidea
- Family: Noctuidae
- Genus: Agrotis
- Species: A. dislocata

Binomial name
- Agrotis dislocata (Walker, 1856)

Synonyms
- Leucania dislocata Walker, 1856; Feltia dislocata; Euxoa dislocata; Feltia lookii Swezey, 1947

= Agrotis dislocata =

Species of moth

Agrotis dislocata, the lesser native cutworm, is a moth of the family Noctuidae. It was first described by Francis Walker in 1856. It is endemic to the Hawaiian islands of Niihau, Kauai, Oahu, Molokai, Maui, Lanai, Hawaii and Laysan.

The larvae feed on various garden crops, Chenopodium, grasses and sugarcane. It can be a pest in sugarcane, in gardens and in other crops.
