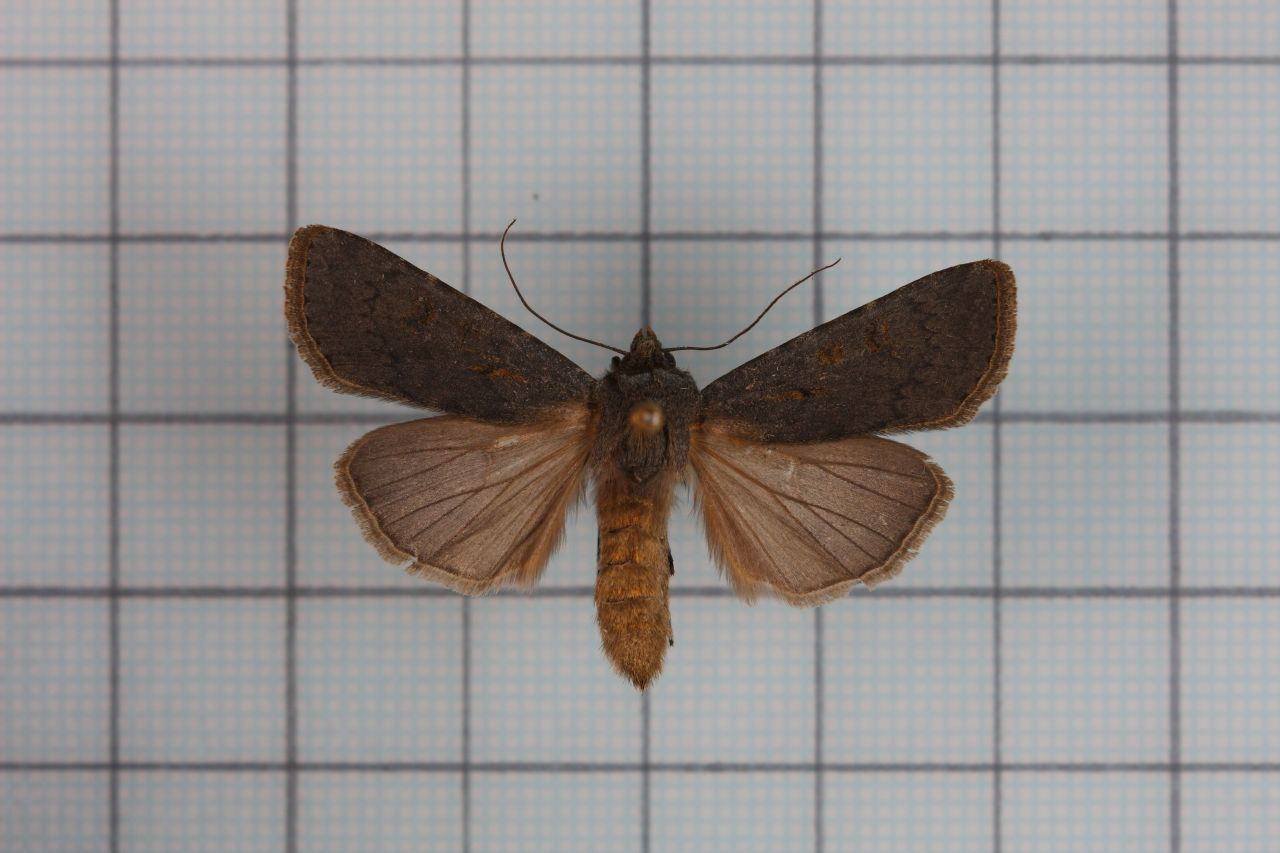

Scientific classification
- Kingdom: Animalia
- Phylum: Arthropoda
- Clade: Pancrustacea
- Class: Insecta
- Order: Lepidoptera
- Superfamily: Noctuoidea
- Family: Noctuidae
- Genus: Agrotis
- Species: A. taiwana

Binomial name
- Agrotis taiwana B.S.Chang, 1991

= Agrotis taiwana =

Species of moth

Agrotis taiwana is a moth of the family Noctuidae. It is found in Taiwan.
