= Agrotis arenarius =

Scientific classification
- Kingdom: Animalia
- Phylum: Arthropoda
- Clade: Pancrustacea
- Class: Insecta
- Order: Lepidoptera
- Superfamily: Noctuoidea
- Family: Noctuidae
- Genus: Agrotis
- Species: A. arenarius

Binomial name
- Agrotis arenarius Neil, 1983

Species of moth

Agrotis arenarius, the Sable Island cutworm moth, is a moth of the family Noctuidae. It is endemic to Sable Island, Nova Scotia.
