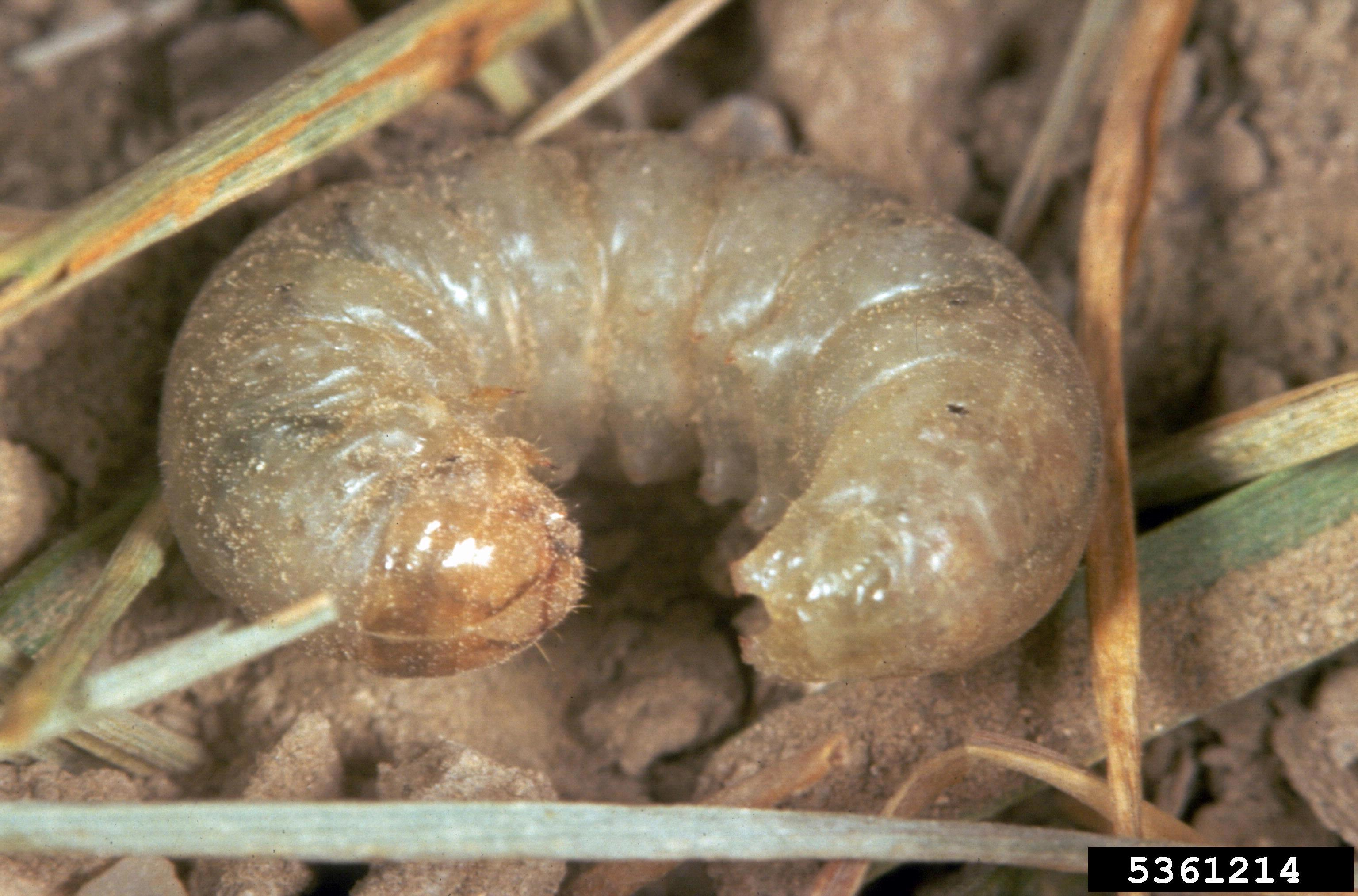

Scientific classification
- Kingdom: Animalia
- Phylum: Arthropoda
- Clade: Pancrustacea
- Class: Insecta
- Order: Lepidoptera
- Superfamily: Noctuoidea
- Family: Noctuidae
- Genus: Agrotis
- Species: A. orthogonia

Binomial name
- Agrotis orthogonia Morrison, 1876

Synonyms
- Agrotis orthogonoides McDunnough, 1946

= Agrotis orthogonia =

Pale western cutworm

Species of moth

Agrotis orthogonia, the pale western cutworm, is a moth of the family Noctuidae. The species was first described by Herbert Knowles Morrison in 1876. It is found in North America, more specifically dry, semi-desert areas of western North America from southern Canada to California, ranging eastward nearly to the eastern edge of the Great Plains.

The wingspan is about 34 mm.

== Subspecies ==
- Agrotis orthogonia delorata
- Agrotis orthogonia duae
