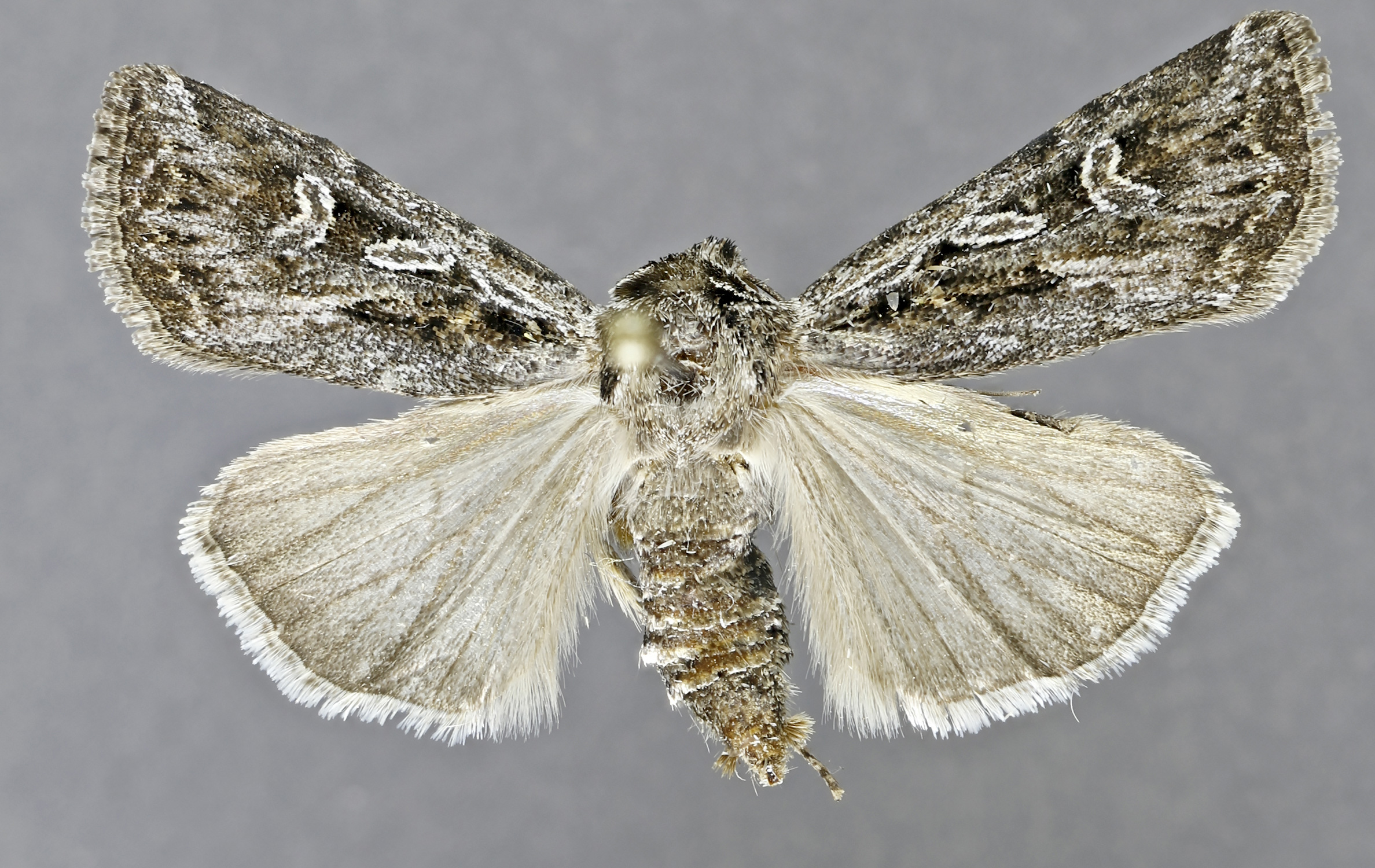

Scientific classification
- Kingdom: Animalia
- Phylum: Arthropoda
- Clade: Pancrustacea
- Class: Insecta
- Order: Lepidoptera
- Superfamily: Noctuoidea
- Family: Noctuidae
- Genus: Agrotis
- Species: A. robustior

Binomial name
- Agrotis robustior Smith, 1899

Synonyms
- Feltia robustior

= Agrotis robustior =

Species of moth

Agrotis robustior is a moth of the family Noctuidae first described by Smith in 1899. It is found on the northern Great Plains of North America, the Prairie Provinces of Canada southward to South Dakota and Colorado.

The wingspan is about 40 mm.
