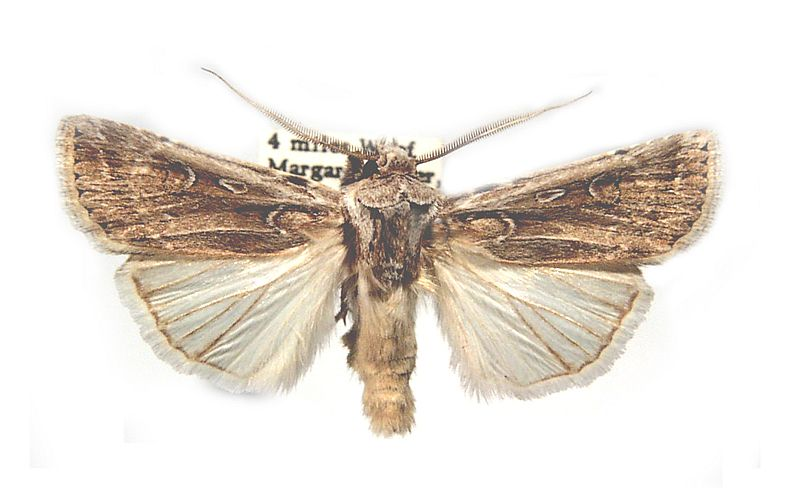

Scientific classification
- Kingdom: Animalia
- Phylum: Arthropoda
- Clade: Pancrustacea
- Class: Insecta
- Order: Lepidoptera
- Superfamily: Noctuoidea
- Family: Noctuidae
- Genus: Agrotis
- Species: A. poliophaea

Binomial name
- Agrotis poliophaea Turner, 1926

= Agrotis poliophaea =

Species of moth

Agrotis poliophaea is a moth of the family Noctuidae. It is found in Western Australia.
