= Agrotis apicalis =

Scientific classification
- Kingdom: Animalia
- Phylum: Arthropoda
- Clade: Pancrustacea
- Class: Insecta
- Order: Lepidoptera
- Superfamily: Noctuoidea
- Family: Noctuidae
- Genus: Agrotis
- Species: A. apicalis

Binomial name
- Agrotis apicalis Herrich-Schäffer, 1868

Species of moth

Agrotis apicalis is a moth of the family Noctuidae first described by Gottlieb August Wilhelm Herrich-Schäffer in 1868. It is found in Florida, the Dominican Republic, Jamaica, Puerto Rico and Cuba.

The wingspan is about 38 mm.
