= Agrotis altivagans =

Scientific classification
- Kingdom: Animalia
- Phylum: Arthropoda
- Clade: Pancrustacea
- Class: Insecta
- Order: Lepidoptera
- Superfamily: Noctuoidea
- Family: Noctuidae
- Genus: Agrotis
- Species: A. altivagans

Binomial name
- Agrotis altivagans Varga (1979)

Species of moth

Agrotis altivagans is a moth of the family Noctuidae first described by Varga in 1979. It can be found in Pakistan, Kaghan Besal.
