= Agrotis consentanea =

Scientific classification
- Kingdom: Animalia
- Phylum: Arthropoda
- Clade: Pancrustacea
- Class: Insecta
- Order: Lepidoptera
- Superfamily: Noctuoidea
- Family: Noctuidae
- Genus: Agrotis
- Species: A. consentanea

Binomial name
- Agrotis consentanea Mabille, 1880

Species of moth

Agrotis consentanea is a moth of the family Noctuidae. It is found on Madagascar and on the islands of the Cosmoledo atoll (Seychelles).
