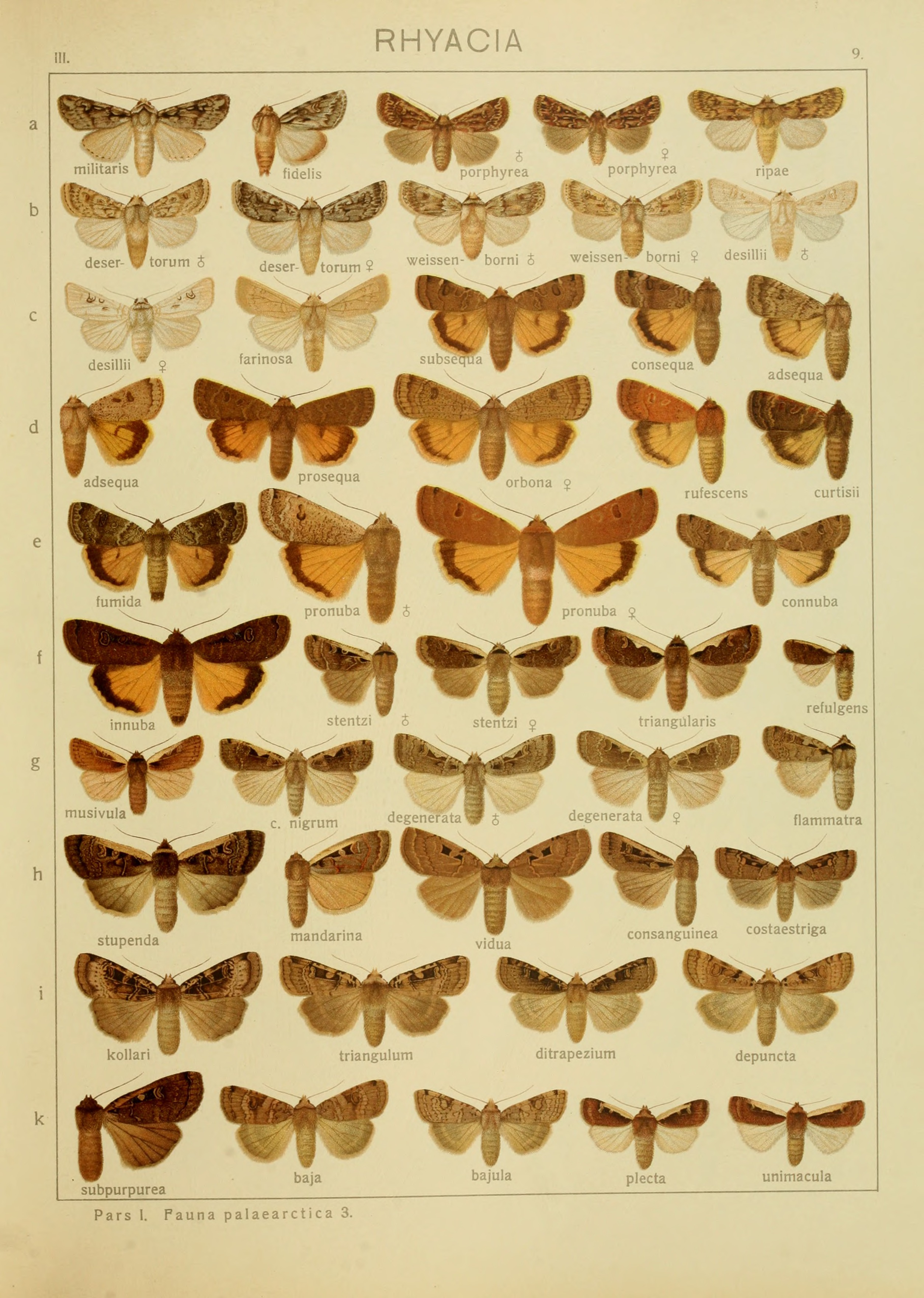
- as desertorum (9b)

Conservation status
- Least Concern (IUCN 3.1)

Scientific classification
- Kingdom: Animalia
- Phylum: Arthropoda
- Clade: Pancrustacea
- Class: Insecta
- Order: Lepidoptera
- Superfamily: Noctuoidea
- Family: Noctuidae
- Genus: Agrotis
- Species: A. alexandriensis

Binomial name
- Agrotis alexandriensis Bethune-Baker, 1894

Synonyms
- Rhyacia arens Turati, 1926; Rhyacia arens albonitens Krüger, 1933

= Agrotis alexandriensis =

Species of moth

Agrotis alexandriensis is a species moth of the family Noctuidae. It is known from the beaches and saline inland deserts of Spain, Portugal, Egypt, Libya, Tunisia, Israel, and the Arabian Peninsula.
