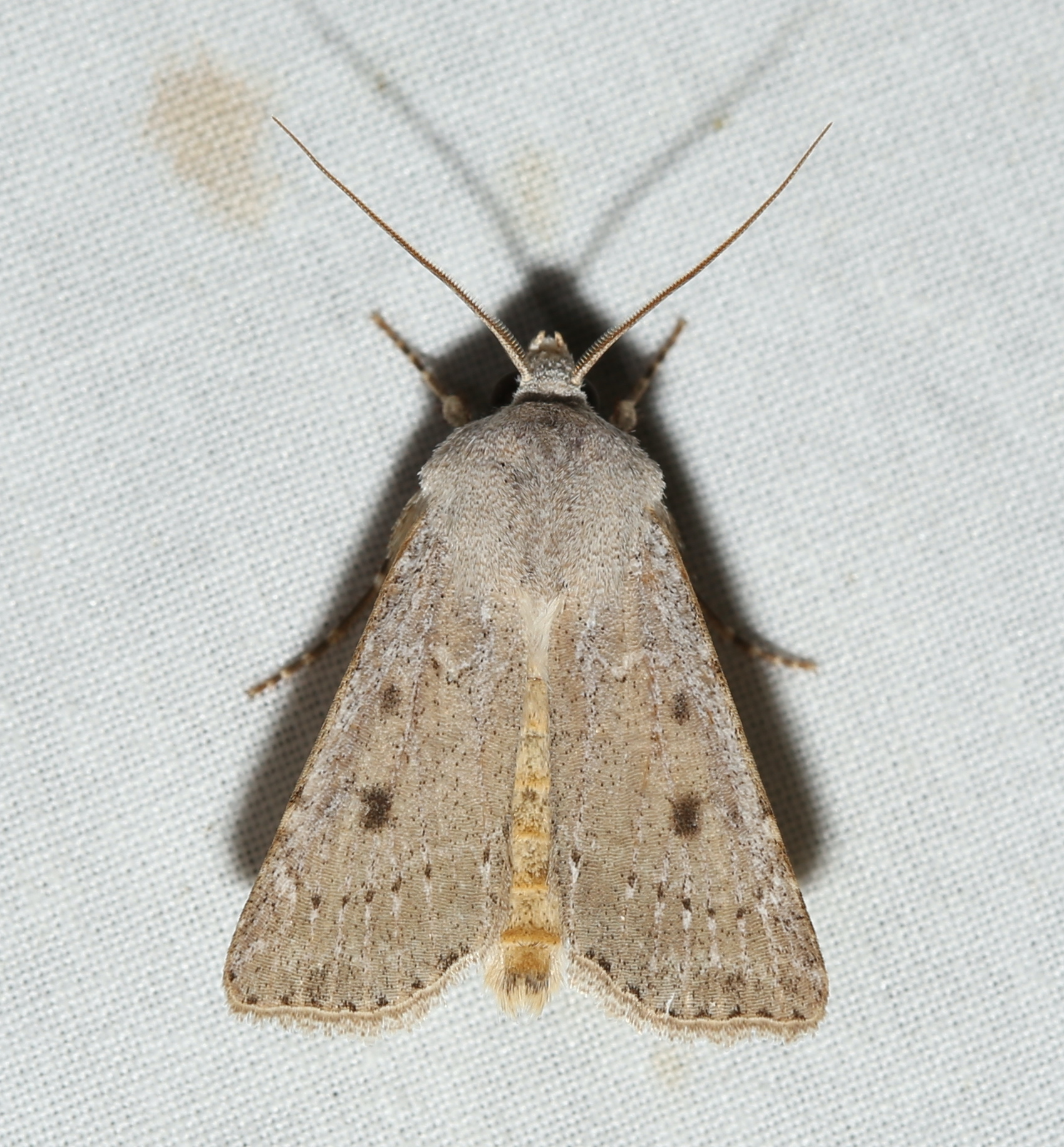

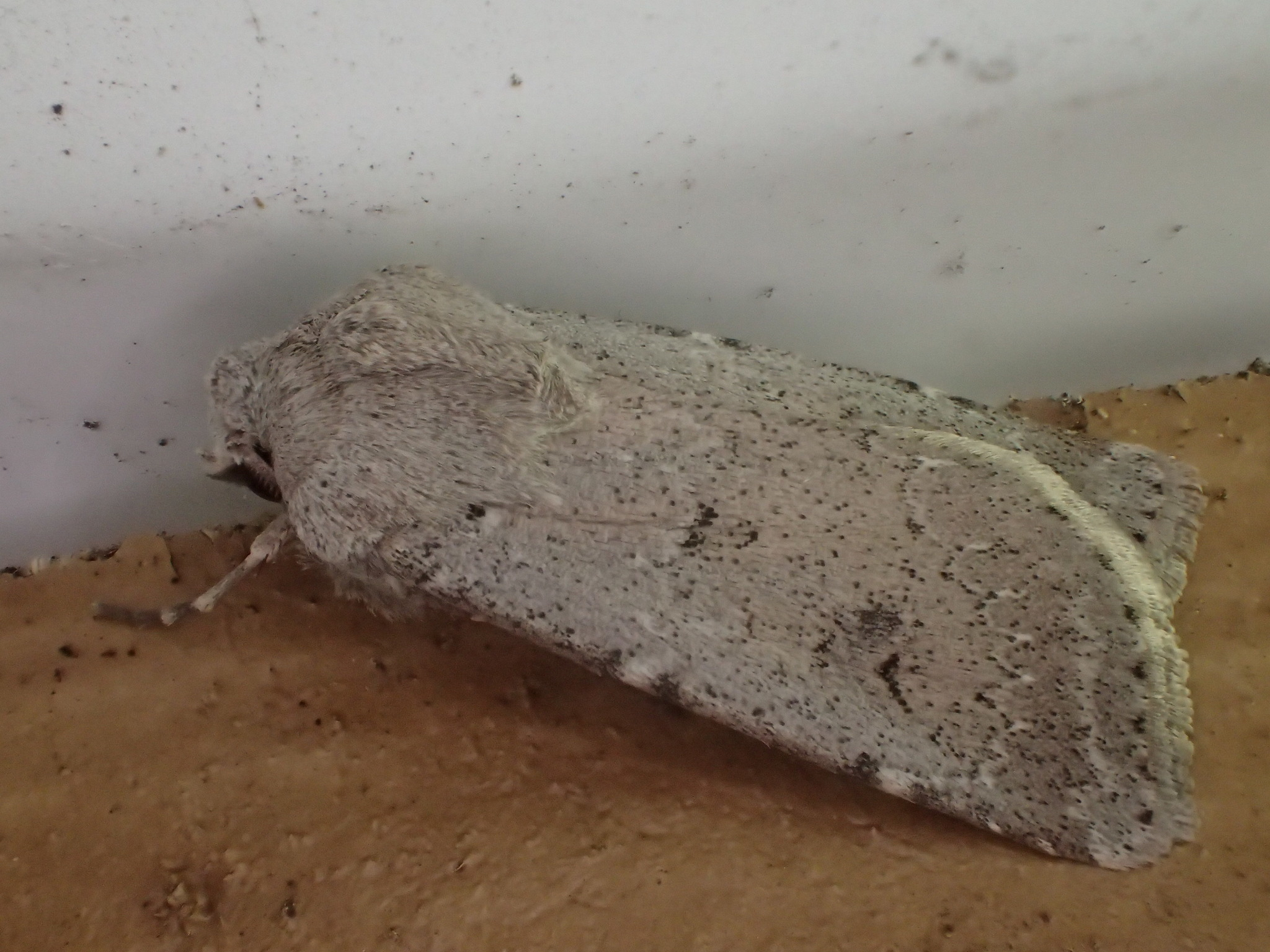

Scientific classification
- Kingdom: Animalia
- Phylum: Arthropoda
- Clade: Pancrustacea
- Class: Insecta
- Order: Lepidoptera
- Superfamily: Noctuoidea
- Family: Noctuidae
- Genus: Agrotis
- Species: A. vetusta

Binomial name
- Agrotis vetusta Walker, 1865

Synonyms
- Mythimna vetusta; Agrotis muraenula

= Agrotis vetusta =

Species of moth

Agrotis vetusta, the old man dart, spotted-legged cutworm or muted dart (when referring to Agrotis vetusta mutata) is a moth of the family Noctuidae. The species was first described by Francis Walker in 1865. It is found in North America, from southern Alaska to Nova Scotia, southward into Mexico.

The wingspan is 35–42 mm. Adults are on wing from August to September depending on the location.

The larvae feed on various forbs, vegetables, and row crops.

== Subspecies ==
- Agrotis vetusta vetusta
- Agrotis vetusta catenuloides (Great Basin area)
- Agrotis vetusta mutata (west from Manitoba into British Columbia)
