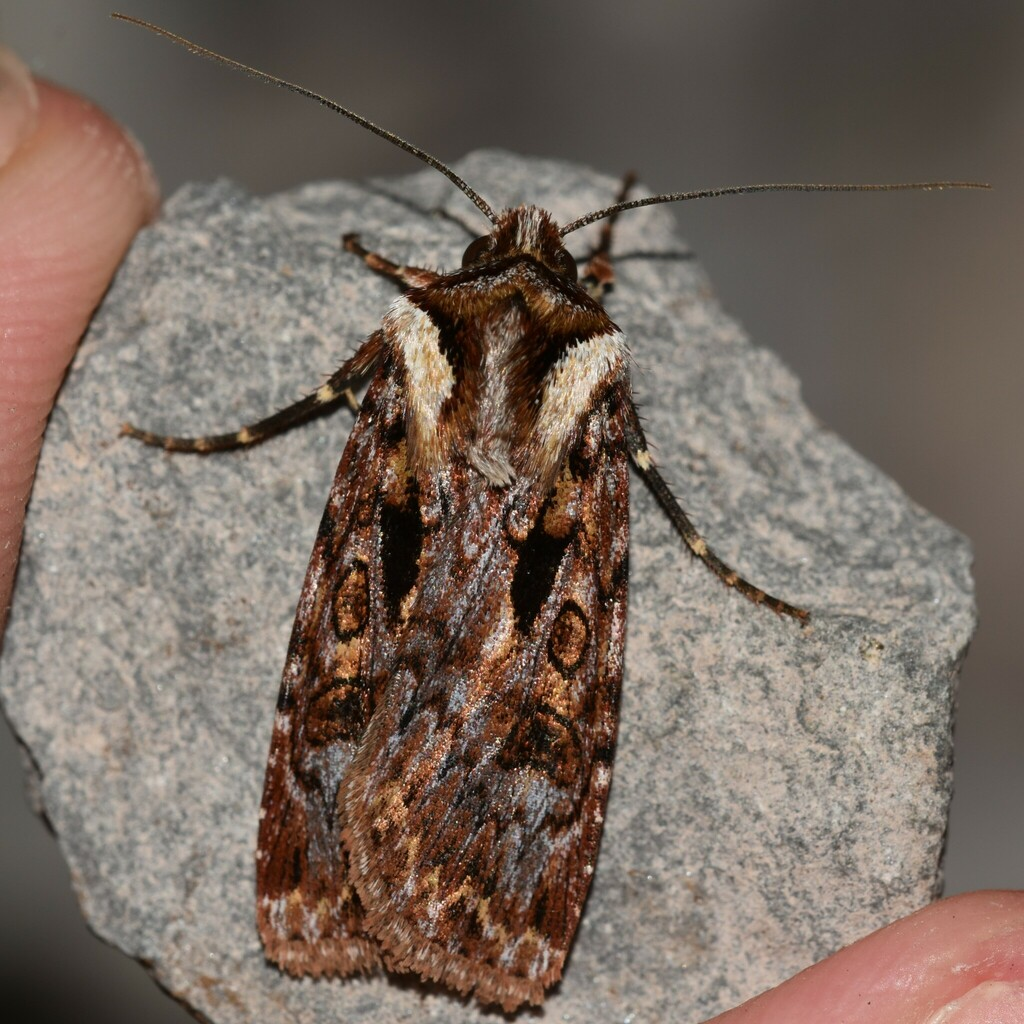
- Agrotis charmocrita photographed on Hawaiʻi

Conservation status
- Data Deficient (IUCN 3.1)

Scientific classification
- Kingdom: Animalia
- Phylum: Arthropoda
- Clade: Pancrustacea
- Class: Insecta
- Order: Lepidoptera
- Superfamily: Noctuoidea
- Family: Noctuidae
- Genus: Agrotis
- Species: A. charmocrita

Binomial name
- Agrotis charmocrita (Meyrick, 1928)

Synonyms
- Euxoa charmocrita Meyrick, 1928

= Agrotis charmocrita =

Species of moth

Agrotis charmocrita is a species of moth in the family Noctuidae. It was first described by Edward Meyrick in 1928. It is endemic to the Hawaiian Islands of Kauaʻi, Molokaʻi, Oʻahu, Lanaʻi, Maui, and Hawaiʻi, however, it has recently been recorded only from Hawaiʻi and Oʻahu.
