= Agrotis coquimbensis =

Scientific classification
- Kingdom: Animalia
- Phylum: Arthropoda
- Clade: Pancrustacea
- Class: Insecta
- Order: Lepidoptera
- Superfamily: Noctuoidea
- Family: Noctuidae
- Genus: Agrotis
- Species: A. coquimbensis

Binomial name
- Agrotis coquimbensis (Hampson, 1903)

Synonyms
- Euxoa coquimbensis Hampson, 1903

Species of moth

Agrotis coquimbensis is a moth of the family Noctuidae. It is found in the Coquimbo Region of Chile.

The wingspan is about 34 mm.
