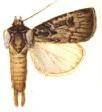

Scientific classification
- Kingdom: Animalia
- Phylum: Arthropoda
- Clade: Pancrustacea
- Class: Insecta
- Order: Lepidoptera
- Superfamily: Noctuoidea
- Family: Noctuidae
- Genus: Agrotis
- Species: A. araucaria

Binomial name
- Agrotis araucaria (Hampson, 1903)

Synonyms
- Euxoa araucaria Hampson, 1903

= Agrotis araucaria =

Species of moth

Agrotis araucaria is a moth of the family Noctuidae. It is found in the Concepción region of Chile as well as the Neuquén Province of Argentina.

The wingspan is 40–44 mm. Adults are on wing from November to December.
