= Agrotis herzogi =

Spalding's dart

Scientific classification
- Kingdom: Animalia
- Phylum: Arthropoda
- Clade: Pancrustacea
- Class: Insecta
- Order: Lepidoptera
- Superfamily: Noctuoidea
- Family: Noctuidae
- Genus: Agrotis
- Species: A. herzogi

Binomial name
- Agrotis herzogi Rebel, 1911

Species of moth

Agrotis herzogi, Spalding's dart, is a moth of the family Noctuidae. It is found in the eremic zone from North Africa to the Arabian Peninsula and Iran.

Adults are on wing from October to April depending on the location. There is one generation per year.
