= Agrotis panoplias =

Kona agrotis noctuid moth

Conservation status
- Critically endangered, possibly extinct (IUCN 3.1)

Scientific classification
- Kingdom: Animalia
- Phylum: Arthropoda
- Clade: Pancrustacea
- Class: Insecta
- Order: Lepidoptera
- Superfamily: Noctuoidea
- Family: Noctuidae
- Genus: Agrotis
- Species: A. panoplias

Binomial name
- Agrotis panoplias Meyrick, 1899

Synonyms
- Euxoa panoplias (Meyrick) Hampson, 1903

Species of moth

Agrotis panoplias, the Kona agrotis noctuid moth, is a species of moth in the family Noctuidae. It is now considered as possibly extinct.

Formerly, it was endemic to Kona District, Hawaii, United States.

== Sources ==
- 2006 IUCN Red List of Threatened Species.
- Hawaii's Extinct Species - Insects
