= Agrotis plumiger =

Scientific classification
- Kingdom: Animalia
- Phylum: Arthropoda
- Clade: Pancrustacea
- Class: Insecta
- Order: Lepidoptera
- Superfamily: Noctuoidea
- Family: Noctuidae
- Genus: Agrotis
- Species: A. plumiger

Binomial name
- Agrotis plumiger Krüger, 2005

Species of moth

Agrotis plumiger is a moth of the family Noctuidae first described by Martin Krüger in 2005. It is endemic to Lesotho.
