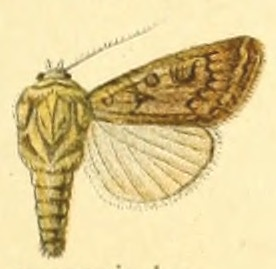

Scientific classification
- Kingdom: Animalia
- Phylum: Arthropoda
- Clade: Pancrustacea
- Class: Insecta
- Order: Lepidoptera
- Superfamily: Noctuoidea
- Family: Noctuidae
- Genus: Agrotis
- Species: A. cursoriodes

Binomial name
- Agrotis cursoriodes (Hampson, 1903)

Synonyms
- Euxoa cursoriodes Hampson, 1903

= Agrotis cursoriodes =

Species of moth

Agrotis cursoriodes is a moth of the family Noctuidae. It is found in Syria.
