= Agrotis psammophaea =

Scientific classification
- Kingdom: Animalia
- Phylum: Arthropoda
- Clade: Pancrustacea
- Class: Insecta
- Order: Lepidoptera
- Superfamily: Noctuoidea
- Family: Noctuidae
- Genus: Agrotis
- Species: A. psammophaea

Binomial name
- Agrotis psammophaea Meyrick, 1899

Synonyms
- Euxoa psammophaea

Species of moth

Agrotis psammophaea is a moth of the family Noctuidae. It was first described by Edward Meyrick in 1899. It is endemic to the Hawaiian islands of Kauai, Oahu, Maui, and Hawaii.
