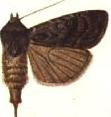

Scientific classification
- Kingdom: Animalia
- Phylum: Arthropoda
- Clade: Pancrustacea
- Class: Insecta
- Order: Lepidoptera
- Superfamily: Noctuoidea
- Family: Noctuidae
- Genus: Agrotis
- Species: A. mesotoxa

Binomial name
- Agrotis mesotoxa Meyrick, 1899

Synonyms
- Euxoa mesotoxa (Meyrick) Hampson, 1903

= Agrotis mesotoxa =

Species of moth

Agrotis mesotoxa is a moth of the family Noctuidae. It is endemic to Kauai, Maui and Hawaii.
