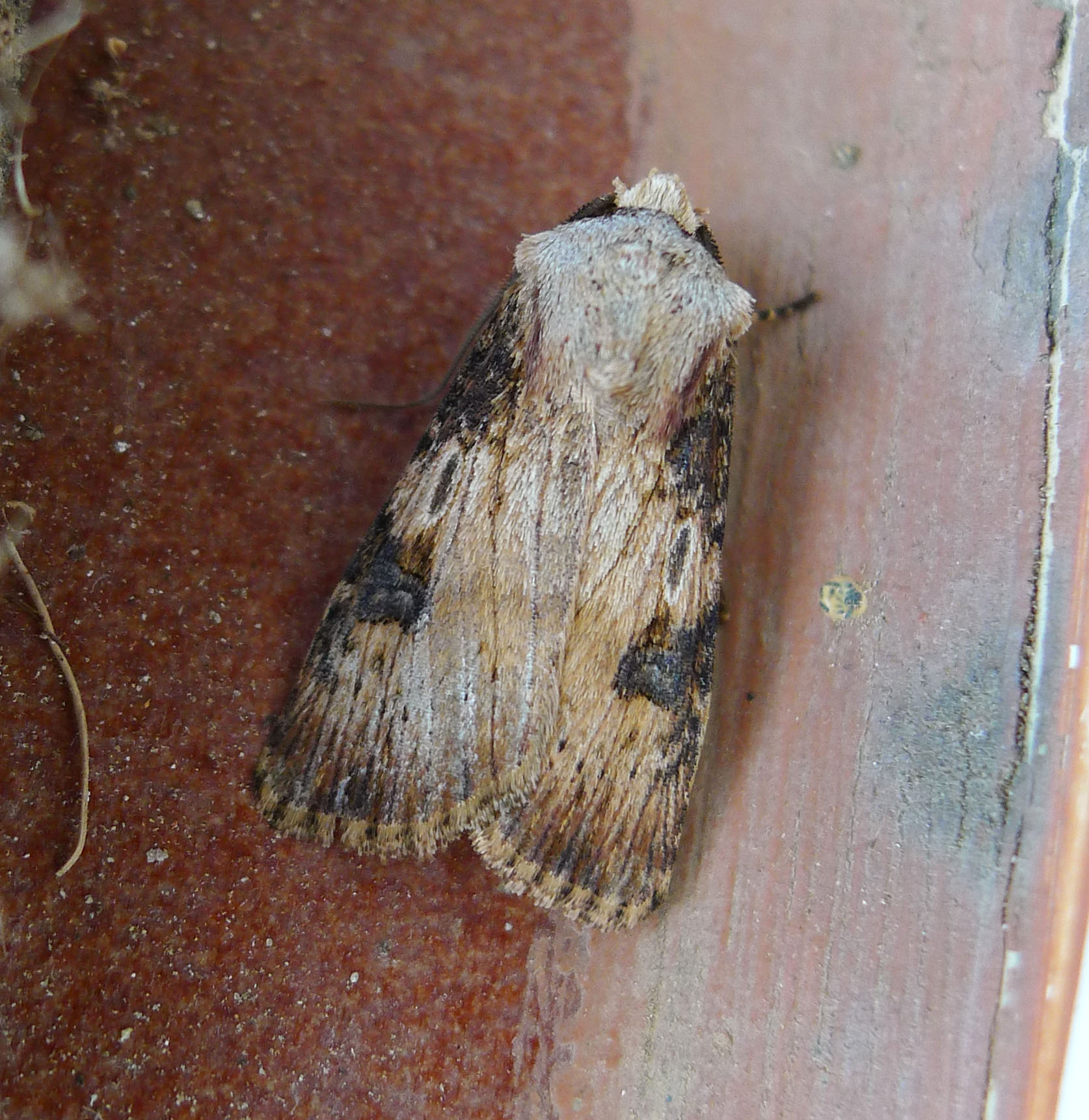

Scientific classification
- Kingdom: Animalia
- Phylum: Arthropoda
- Clade: Pancrustacea
- Class: Insecta
- Order: Lepidoptera
- Superfamily: Noctuoidea
- Family: Noctuidae
- Genus: Agrotis
- Species: A. syricola

Binomial name
- Agrotis syricola Corti & Draudt, 1933

Synonyms
- Agrotis puta syricola Berio, 1936

= Agrotis syricola =

Species of moth

Agrotis syricola is a moth of the family Noctuidae. It is found in the eastern part of Mediterranean Basin, more specifically southern Italy, Greece, southern Bulgaria, the Mediterranean part of Turkey, Jordan and Israel.

Adults are on wing from February to April and October and November. There are multiple generations per year.
