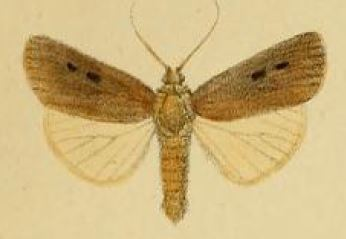

Scientific classification
- Kingdom: Animalia
- Phylum: Arthropoda
- Clade: Pancrustacea
- Class: Insecta
- Order: Lepidoptera
- Superfamily: Noctuoidea
- Family: Noctuidae
- Genus: Agrotis
- Species: A. talda

Binomial name
- Agrotis talda (Schaus & Clements, 1893)

Synonyms
- Ochropleura talda Schaus & Clements, 1893

= Agrotis talda =

Species of moth

Agrotis talda is a moth of the family Noctuidae described by William Schaus and W. G. Clements in 1893. It is found in Sierra Leone.
