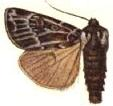

Conservation status
- Data Deficient (IUCN 3.1) (Europe regional assessment)

Scientific classification
- Kingdom: Animalia
- Phylum: Arthropoda
- Clade: Pancrustacea
- Class: Insecta
- Order: Lepidoptera
- Superfamily: Noctuoidea
- Family: Noctuidae
- Genus: Agrotis
- Species: A. characteristica

Binomial name
- Agrotis characteristica Alphéraky, 1892

Synonyms
- Agrotis robusta Eversmann, 1856; Euxoa robusta (Eversmann, 1856); Agrotis robustana Poole, 1989

= Agrotis characteristica =

Species of moth

Agrotis characteristica is a species of moth in the family Noctuidae. It is found in the Ural Mountains, Siberia, central Asia, Mongolia, China, and Korea.
