= Agrotis luehri =

Scientific classification
- Domain: Eukaryota
- Kingdom: Animalia
- Phylum: Arthropoda
- Class: Insecta
- Order: Lepidoptera
- Superfamily: Noctuoidea
- Family: Noctuidae
- Genus: Agrotis
- Species: A. luehri

Binomial name
- Agrotis luehri Mentzer & Moberg, 1987

Species of moth

Agrotis luehri is a species of moth belonging to the family Noctuidae.

It is native to Norway.
