= Agrotis emboloma =

Scientific classification
- Kingdom: Animalia
- Phylum: Arthropoda
- Clade: Pancrustacea
- Class: Insecta
- Order: Lepidoptera
- Superfamily: Noctuoidea
- Family: Noctuidae
- Genus: Agrotis
- Species: A. emboloma

Binomial name
- Agrotis emboloma (Lower, 1918)

Synonyms
- Ariathisa emboloma Lower, O.B. 1918; Agrotis cygnea Common, I.F.B. 1958

Species of moth

Agrotis emboloma is a moth of the family Noctuidae. It is found in the New South Wales, South Australia and Western Australia.
