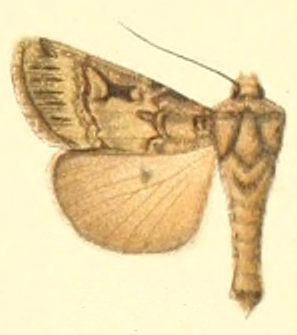

Scientific classification
- Kingdom: Animalia
- Phylum: Arthropoda
- Clade: Pancrustacea
- Class: Insecta
- Order: Lepidoptera
- Superfamily: Noctuoidea
- Family: Noctuidae
- Genus: Agrotis
- Species: A. submolesta

Binomial name
- Agrotis submolesta Püngeler, [1899] 1900

Synonyms
- Euxoa submolesta

= Agrotis submolesta =

Species of moth

Agrotis submolesta is a moth of the family Noctuidae. It is found in Mongolia.
