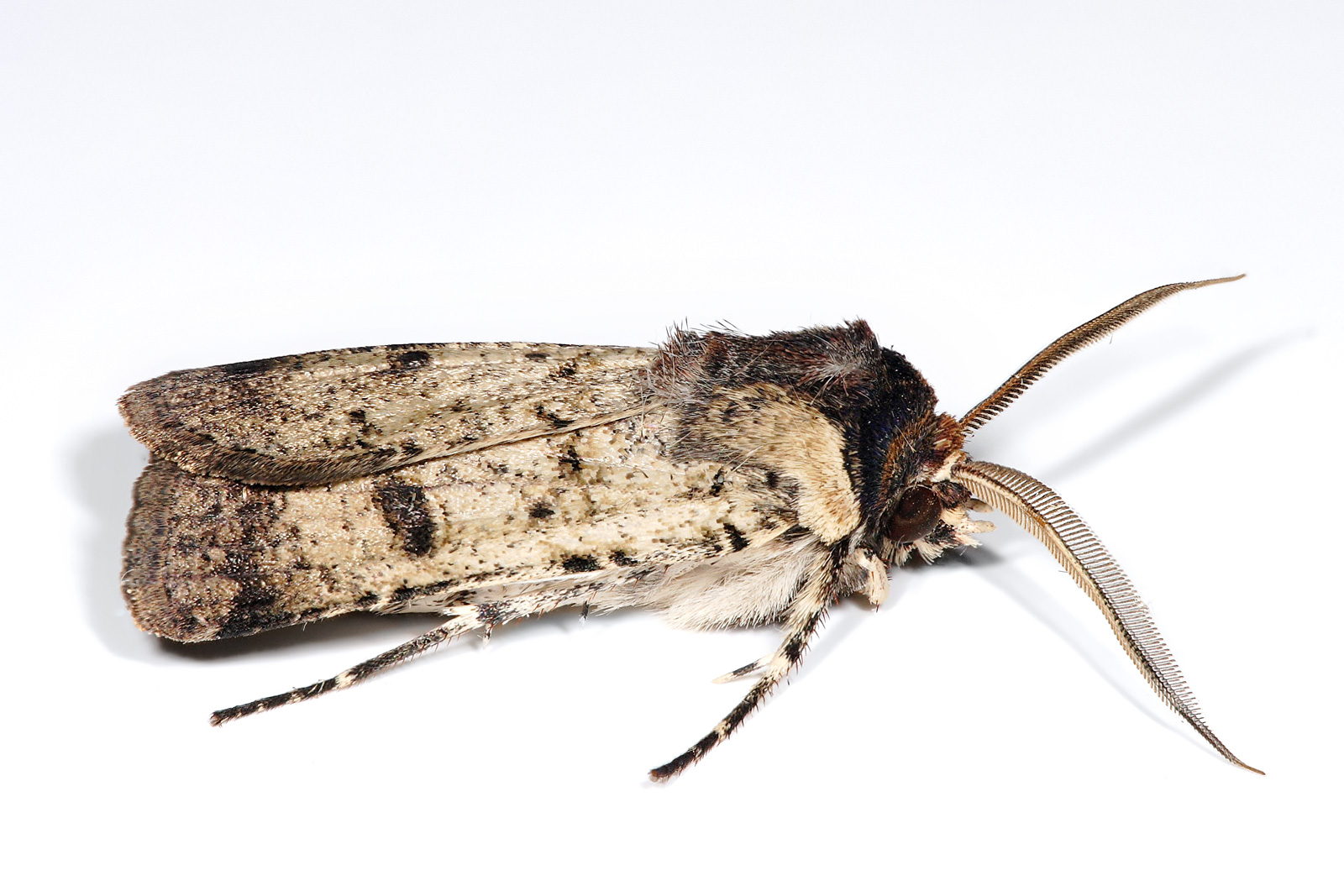
- Adult male
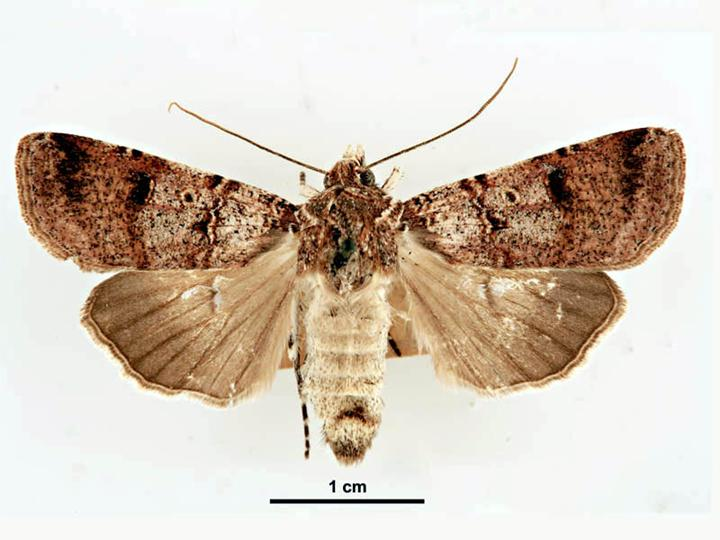
- Mounted female

Scientific classification
- Kingdom: Animalia
- Phylum: Arthropoda
- Clade: Pancrustacea
- Class: Insecta
- Order: Lepidoptera
- Superfamily: Noctuoidea
- Family: Noctuidae
- Genus: Agrotis
- Species: A. porphyricollis

Binomial name
- Agrotis porphyricollis Guenée, 1852

Synonyms
- Perigea albinasus Walker, 1857; Euxoa porphyricollis; Agrotis porphyricollis Guenée, 1852; Agrotis recondita Walker, 1857; Graphiphora reclusa Walker, 1857; Agrotis rubrilinea Walker, 1857; Agrotis dorsicinis Walker, 1858; Graphiphora lapidosa Walker, 1858; Hadena albipalpis Walker, 1865; Elegarda summa Walker, 1865; Spaelotis pectinata Walker, 1865; Tetrapyrgia graphiphorides Walker, 1865; Elegarda orthosioides Walker, 1865; Agrotis transversa Walker, 1869; Agrotis baueri R. Felder & Rogenhofer, 1874; Graphiphora ctenota Turner, 1939

= Agrotis porphyricollis =

Variable cutworm

Species of moth

Agrotis porphyricollis (variable cutworm) is a noctuid moth. It is found in Tasmania, Victoria and New South Wales.

The wingspan is about 30 mm.
