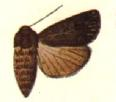

Scientific classification
- Kingdom: Animalia
- Phylum: Arthropoda
- Clade: Pancrustacea
- Class: Insecta
- Order: Lepidoptera
- Superfamily: Noctuoidea
- Family: Noctuidae
- Genus: Agrotis
- Species: A. brachystria

Binomial name
- Agrotis brachystria (Hampson, 1903)

Synonyms
- Porosagrotis brachystria Hampson, 1903

= Agrotis brachystria =

Species of moth

Agrotis brachystria is a species of moth of the family Noctuidae. It is found in Argentina and Rio Grande do Sul in Brazil.
