= Agrotis aulacias =

Conservation status
- Data Deficient (IUCN 3.1)

Scientific classification
- Kingdom: Animalia
- Phylum: Arthropoda
- Clade: Pancrustacea
- Class: Insecta
- Order: Lepidoptera
- Superfamily: Noctuoidea
- Family: Noctuidae
- Genus: Agrotis
- Species: A. aulacias

Binomial name
- Agrotis aulacias Meyrick, 1899

Synonyms
- Feltia aulacias; Euxoa aulacias

Species of moth

Agrotis aulacias is a species of moth in the family Noctuidae. It was described by Edward Meyrick in 1899. It is endemic to the Hawaiian Islands.
