= Agrotis bilitura =

Scientific classification
- Kingdom: Animalia
- Phylum: Arthropoda
- Clade: Pancrustacea
- Class: Insecta
- Order: Lepidoptera
- Superfamily: Noctuoidea
- Family: Noctuidae
- Genus: Agrotis
- Species: A. bilitura

Binomial name
- Agrotis bilitura Guenée, 1852

Synonyms
- Spaelotis cineraria Blanchard, 1852; Agrotis deprivata Walker, 1857; Agrotis nuda Köhler, 1979

Species of moth

Agrotis bilitura, the potato cutworm, is a moth of the family Noctuidae. It is found from the Tarapacá Region to the Magallanes Region and the Juan Fernández Islands in Chile, Argentina, Huánuco Region in Peru and Uruguay.

The wingspan is 30–43 mm. Adults are on wing from October to November and in January.

The larvae feed on various plants, including beet, artichoke, cotton, beetroot, onion, cauliflower, asparagus, spinach, kidney bean, tobacco, tomato, clovers, carrot, melon, sweet cucumber, beet and cabbage.
