= Agrotis microreas =

Conservation status
- Extinct (IUCN 2.3)

Scientific classification
- Kingdom: Animalia
- Phylum: Arthropoda
- Clade: Pancrustacea
- Class: Insecta
- Order: Lepidoptera
- Superfamily: Noctuoidea
- Family: Noctuidae
- Genus: Agrotis
- Species: †A. microreas

Binomial name
- †Agrotis microreas Meyrick, 1899

Synonyms
- Agrotiphila microreas

Extinct species of moth

Agrotis microreas was a moth in the family Noctuidae. It is now an extinct species.

Before its extinction within the last century, it was endemic to Hawaii, United States.
