= Onychagrotis =

Scientific classification
- Kingdom: Animalia
- Phylum: Arthropoda
- Class: Insecta
- Order: Lepidoptera
- Superfamily: Noctuoidea
- Family: Noctuidae
- Subfamily: Noctuinae
- Genus: Onychagrotis; Hampson, 1903

Genus of moths

Onychagrotis was a genus of moths of the family Noctuidae, it is now considered a synonym of Agrotis.

== Former species ==
- Onychagrotis rileyana (Morrison, 1875)
