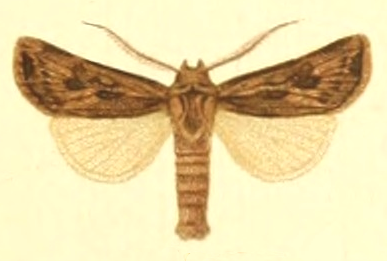

Conservation status
- Vulnerable (IUCN 3.1) (Europe regional assessment)

Scientific classification
- Kingdom: Animalia
- Phylum: Arthropoda
- Clade: Pancrustacea
- Class: Insecta
- Order: Lepidoptera
- Superfamily: Noctuoidea
- Family: Noctuidae
- Genus: Agrotis
- Species: A. endogaea

Binomial name
- Agrotis endogaea Boisduval, 1834

Synonyms
- Euxoa endogaea; Agrotis arenicola Staudinger, 1870

= Agrotis endogaea =

Species of moth

Agrotis endogaea is a moth of the family Noctuidae. It is found in Greece, Corsica, Sardinia, Tunisia and the Canary Islands. It was recently recorded from Sicily.

Larvae have been recorded on Genista and Melandrium species.

== Subspecies ==
- Agrotis endogaea endogaea Dumont, 1903 (Corsica, Sardinia, Sicily)
- Agrotis endogaea graeca Fibiger, 1997 (Greece (Serrai))
- Agrotis endogaea punica Pinker, 1980 (Tunisia, Canary Islands)
