= Lespesia archippivora =

Conservation status
- Least Concern (IUCN 3.1)

Scientific classification
- Kingdom: Animalia
- Phylum: Arthropoda
- Class: Insecta
- Order: Diptera
- Family: Tachinidae
- Subfamily: Exoristinae
- Tribe: Eryciini
- Genus: Lespesia
- Species: L. archippivora

Binomial name
- Lespesia archippivora (Riley, 1871)

Synonyms
- Tachina archippivora Riley, 1871

Species of fly

Lespesia archippivora is a species of tachinid fly, which, like all tachinids, are parasitoids of other arthropods. L. archippivora lives in the body of its host resulting in its death. This is not uncommon since it is estimated that about 10% of all insects are parasitoids. L. archippivora is a generalist and able to infect at least 25 lepidopteran species in addition to one species of Hymenoptera. It is common in North America and other species exist worldwide. One study suggests the species is bivoltine.

It is used as a biological control of a number of pests, such the army worm (Mythimna unipuncta), sugarcane leaf roller (Omiodes accepta), corn earworm (Heliothis zea), black cutworm (Agrotis ipsilon), and variegated cutworm (Peridroma saucia).

It is a concern in the morbidity of monarch butterflies. Researchers do not all agree that a high census of L. archippivora may regulate the population or have an effect on the fall migration of eastern monarch butterflies to Mexico. The butterfly does not survive the infection and it is estimated that 6.2% of wild-monitored monarch butterflies are killed by this fly. Even monarch butterfly eggs can be infected.

In 1898 it was introduced into the Hawaiian Islands by Albert Koebele and used as a biological control agent to reduce the population of army worms.

== Reproduction ==
Mating occurs within the first day after the fly emerged from its pupa stage. After mating, the female begins to locate a host. She acts quickly when she finds a host, ovipositing at the posterior end of the caterpillar. The female fly places relatively large eggs on the host. The maggot then hatches and burrows through the surface of the host. Total brood size varies, but typically ranges from 1-10 maggots per host. After infection, Lespesia archippivora maggots go through three larval instars, exit their hosts as a late stage larva and hide under soil substrate. While residing inside its host, the maggot moves freely. After 3 days, the fly larva adheres itself close to a spiracle (breathing tube) of the infected caterpillar. As the maggot continues to mature, it eventually consumes the internal contents of its host. The fly larva then leaves its host. The fly pupates and emerges as a mature fly approximately 10 to 14 days later. A mature female fly lays between 15 and 204 eggs in her lifetime.

== Hyperparisitoids ==
While L. archippivora can infect a host, other parasites, called hyperparasitoids can infect the parasite. A species of wasp, Perilampus hyalinus was found to have infected the tachinid larva, L. archippivora.

== Distribution ==
Canada, United States, Mexico, Fiji, Guam, Hawaiian Islands, Marshall Islands
