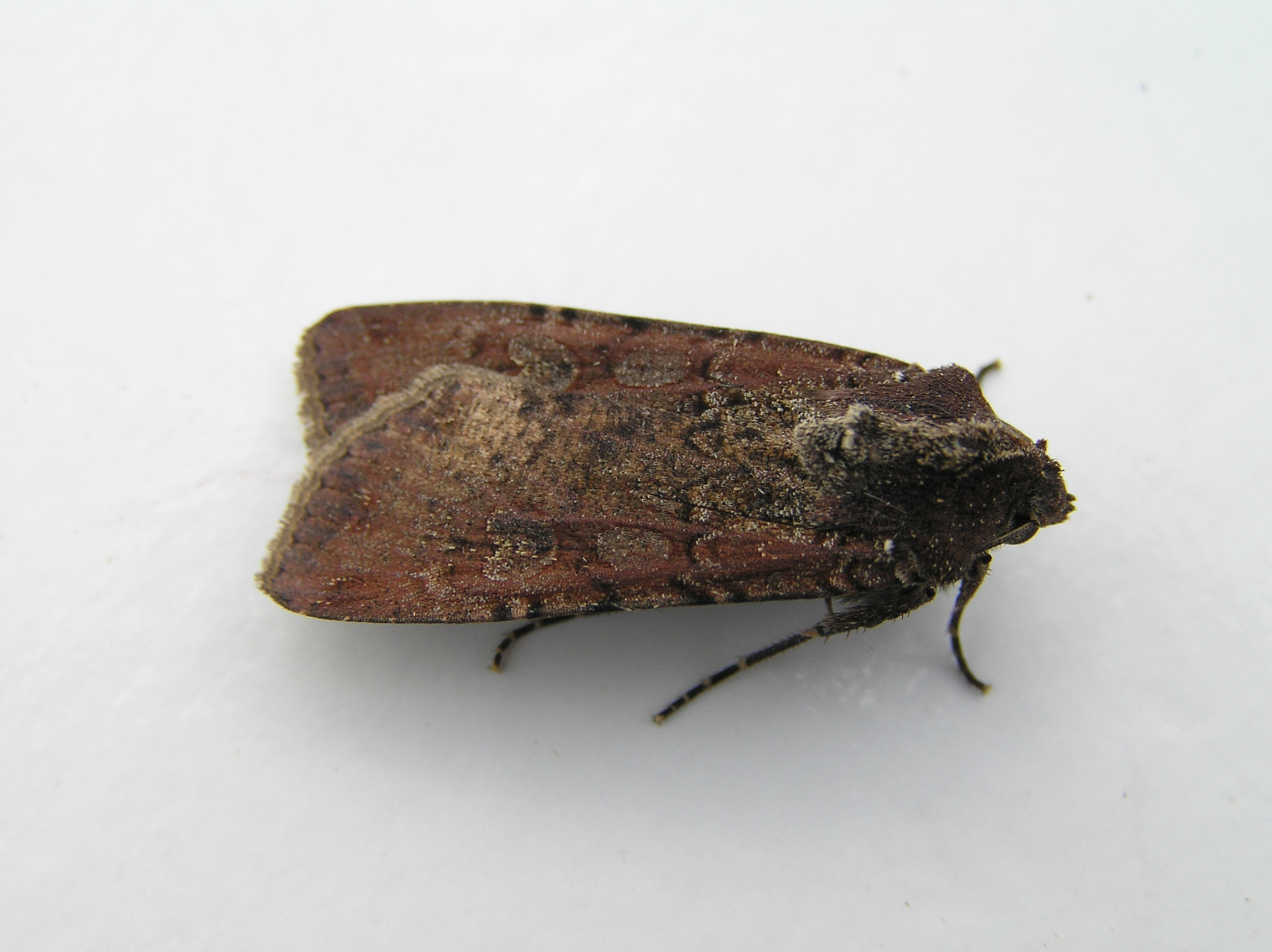

Scientific classification
- Domain: Eukaryota
- Kingdom: Animalia
- Phylum: Arthropoda
- Class: Insecta
- Order: Lepidoptera
- Superfamily: Noctuoidea
- Family: Noctuidae
- Genus: Peridroma
- Species: P. saucia

Binomial name
- Peridroma saucia (Hübner, 1808)

Synonyms
- Noctua saucia Hübner, [1808]; Noctua polygona Borkhausen, 1792 (preocc.); Noctua majuscula (Haworth, 1809); Noctua margaritosa Haworth, 1809; Noctua aequa Hübner, [1813]; Noctua orophila Geyer, 1837; Agrotis inermis Harris, 1841; Spaelotis stictica Blanchard, 1852; Spaelotis infuscata (Blanchard, 1852); Agrotis impacta Walker, [1857]; Agrotis intecta (Walker, [1857]); Agrotis ambrosioides Walker, 1857; Agrotis angulifera (Wallengren, 1860); Agrotis ortonii Packard, 1869; Agrotis nigrocosta Tutt, 1892; Agrotis ochreacosta Tutt, 1892; Agrotis rufa Tutt, 1892; Agrotis brunnea Tutt, 1892; Agrotis philippsi Casparai, 1899; Agrotis ochronota (Hampson, 1903); Agrotis cyrnaea Spuler, 1908; Agrotis fuscobrunnea (Strand, 1915); Agrotis decolor Rebel, 1916; Agrotis tenebricosa Schawerda, 1929; Agrotis juncta Lempke, 1962; Agrotis saucia; Euxoa brunnea

= Peridroma saucia =

Species of moth

Peridroma saucia, the pearly underwing or variegated cutworm, is a moth of the family Noctuidae. The species was first described by Jacob Hübner in 1808. It is found in North and South America, Europe, Asia and Africa. The variegated cutworm feeds on many plants, especially common fruits and vegetables. The moth undergoes two to four generations per year. The development of the moth slows in colder temperatures, indicative of its migratory nature. All stages of the life cycle have a developmental threshold for temperature. The moth is known to migrate to the northern regions during warmer months, returning to the southern regions when the climate becomes colder.

The variegated cutworm has a number of wasp and fly parasites, which account for most of the larval deaths each year. The female P. saucia produces a sex pheromone to attract male moths. Most notably, the variegated cutworm is known as one of the most damaging garden pests. The larvae cause considerable damage to common garden vegetables and fruits, destroying large amounts of crops every year. There are many methods of pest control that are being implemented in order to control P. saucia and its damage to crops.

== Geographic range ==
The variegated cutworm can be found in North and South America, the Hawaiian Islands, Europe, Asia, and North Africa. The origin of the moth is uncertain, but the earliest records with the description of the moth are from Europe in 1790. However, the moth was first observed in North America in 1841, where today it primarily inhabits Southern Canada and Northern United States. P. saucia was discovered in Japan in the 1970s, where it is dubbed "nise-tamanayaga", which directly translates to "false black cutworm moth". As Japanese populations of the variegated cutworm continue to grow, studies are still being conducted to identify the distribution areas in the region.

== Food resources ==
=== Common plants ===
The variegated cutworm larva feeds on many plants, and is known as a common garden pest. Some of these plants include:

==== Vegetables ====
- Beta vulgaris – beets
- Brassica oleracea – cabbage
- Lactuca sativa – lettuce
- Solanum tuberosum – potato
- Medicago sativa – alfalfa
- Plantago sp. – plantain
- Zea mays – corn/maize
- Beta vulgaris – sugarbeet

==== Fruits ====
- Solanum lycopersicum – tomato
- Malus pumila – apple
- Prunus armeniaca – apricot
- Persea americana – avocado
- Prunus sp. – cherry
- Vitis vinifera – currant
- Ribes uvacrispa – gooseberry
- Vitis labrusca – grape
- Citrus limon – lemon
- Morus – mulberry
- Citrus sinensis – orange
- Prunus – plum
- Rubus idaeus – raspberry
- Fragaria ananassa – strawberry

==== Other plants ====
- Hordeum vulgare – barley
- Trifolium sp. – clover
- Gossypium spp. – cotton
- Linum usitatissimum – flax
- Humulus lupulus – hops
- Mentha spp. – mint
- Helianthus annuus – sunflower
- Melilotus – sweet clover
- Nicotiana spp. – tobacco
- Triticum aestivum – wheat

=== Weeds ===
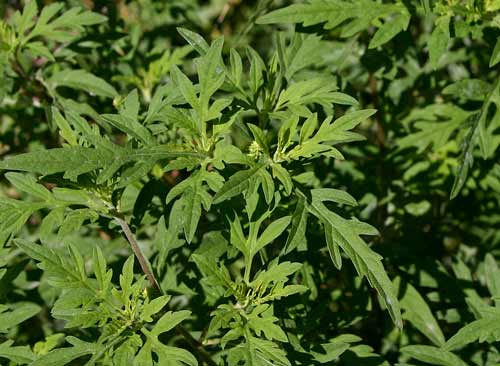
Ragweed, a food resource

P. saucia also feeds on weeds. Feeding on weeds is less common than feeding on fruits and vegetables, but has still been observed. The variegated cutworm feeds on the following weeds:

- Datura sp. – jimsonweed
- Rumex sp. – dock
- Eupatorium capillifolium – dogfennel
- Ambrosia sp. – ragweed
- Capsella bursa-pastoris – shepherd's purse

=== Feeding habits ===
The variegated cutworm feeds mainly when the sun sets. The larvae often hide in the soil or under other shelter during the daytime and move to foliage in the evenings to feed. P. saucia is known to invade greenhouses, where food is plentiful. Larvae are also known to consume large amounts of plants during development, with studies showing up to 125 square centimeters of sugarbeet or 160 square centimeters of potato foliage eaten during their larval stage.

== Parental care ==
=== Oviposition ===
The variegated cutworm begins laying eggs one to two weeks after the adults emerge from pupation. One of the reasons why P. saucia is such a common pest is because of its very high reproductive potential and the difficulty in controlling the moth's mass egg-laying. Studies show that although the moth tends to live longer at slightly colder temperatures (15 °C), the total number of eggs laid is greater at slightly higher temperatures (18–24 °C), suggesting the greater reproductive success at higher temperatures. However, studies have shown that this is due to an extension of the oviposition period, rather than an increase in the number of eggs the female moth lays per day. A female may lay between 1200 and 1400 eggs throughout her life.

== Life cycle ==
In one year, the variegated cutworm will have two to four generations. Generally, in colder areas, such as the Canadian populations of P. saucia, the moth undergoes two generations, whereas in warmer regions, P. saucia has three to four generations per year. Additionally, while pupa and larvae may be able to live through the winter, moths still migrate into cooler areas each spring and return to the warmer areas each fall. The moths travel long distances when migrating each year, so researchers have found it difficult to determine the exact number of generations based on just the adult populations of moths.

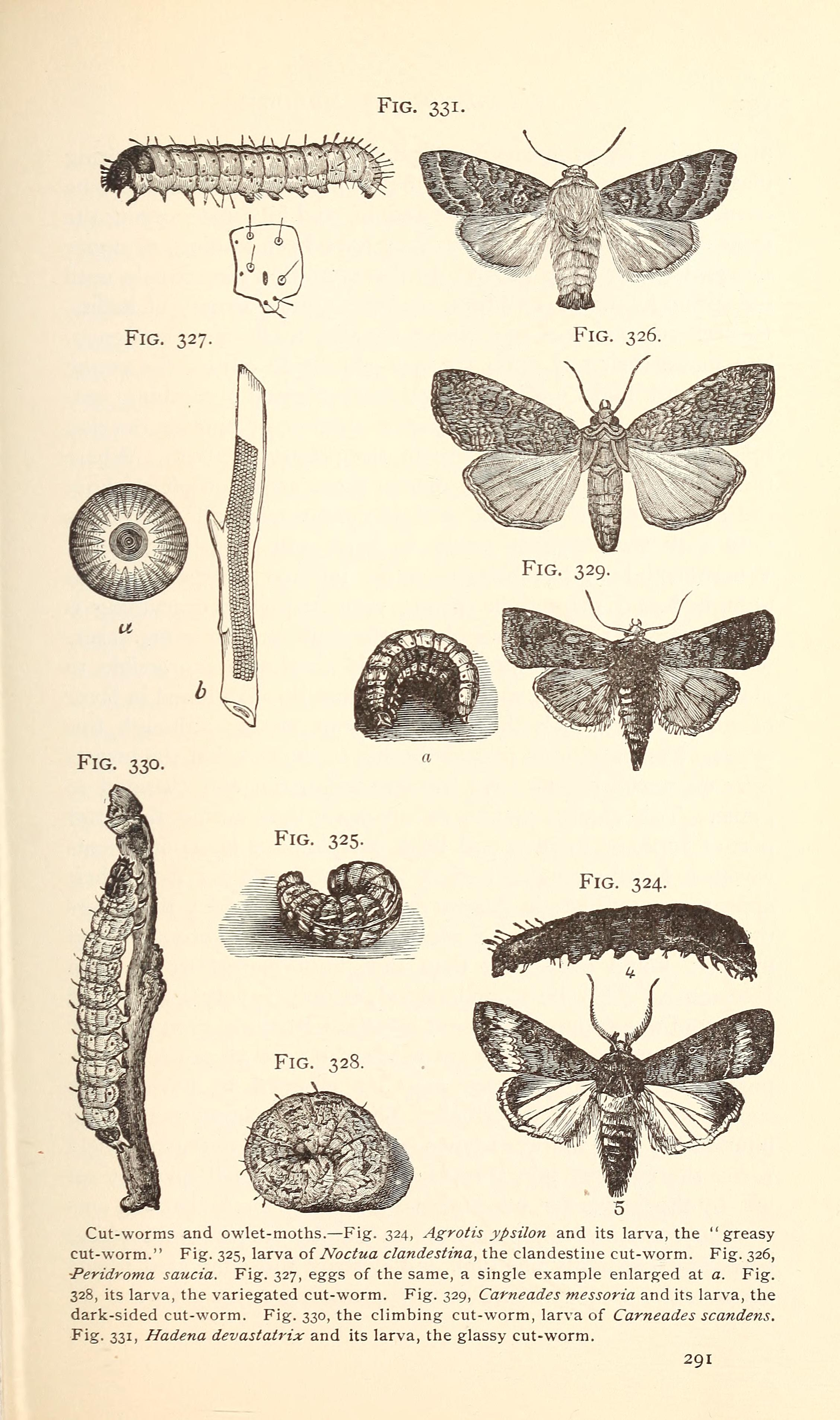
Life cycle

=== Egg ===
The hemispherical egg is flattened at its end, where it generally is attached to a leaf or plant stem. The surface of the egg has ridges extending from the center to the edges. They are 0.55–0.58 millimeters in diameter, and 0.40–0.45 mm in height. The egg begins white, but turns brown as it matures. The developmental threshold of the egg is 3.0–6.0 °C. The eggs are generally laid in large groups. In warm weather (20–30 °C), the egg stage lasts between four and six days, whereas in cold weather (15 °C), the egg stage is extended to up to ten days.

=== Larva ===
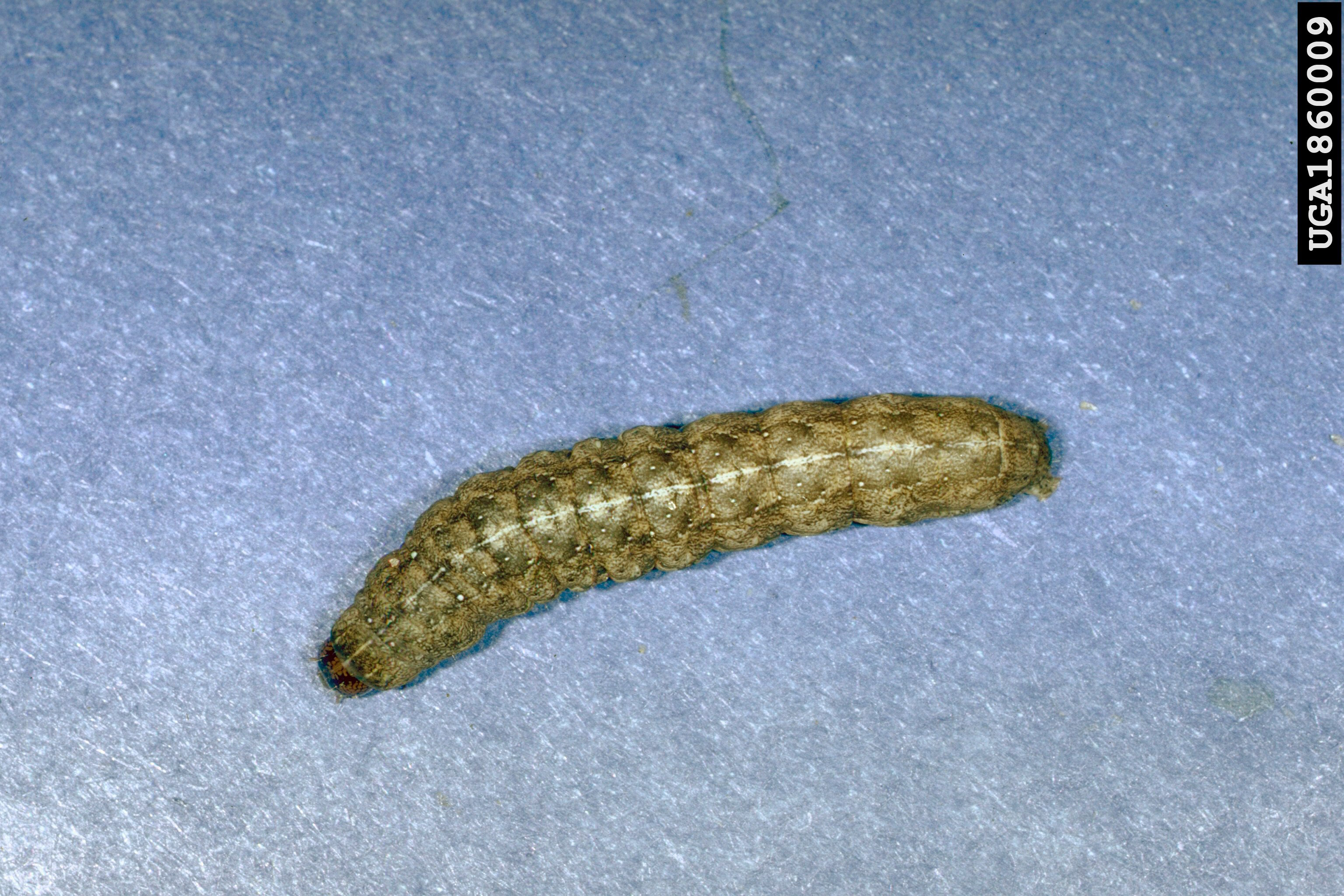
Larva of Peridroma saucia

The larval stage of P. saucia has 6 instars. The developmental threshold for these larvae is 2.6–6.7 °C. The first instar has an average duration of 6.5 days, a head capsule width of 0.30–0.35 millimeters, and a body length of 2.0–3.0 millimeters; the second instar has an average duration of 4.6 days, a head capsule width of 0.46–0.62 millimeters, and a body length of 3.6–6.5 millimeters; the third instar has an average duration of 4.8 days, a head capsule width of 0.80–1.00 millimeters, and a body length of 5.3–9.0 millimeters; the fourth instar has an average duration of 4.7 days, a head capsule width of 1.20–1.65 millimeters, and a body length of 12–16 millimeters; the fifth instar has an average duration of 6.7 days, a head capsule width of 1.9–2.6 millimeters, and a body length of 25–28 millimeters; the sixth instar has an average duration of 16.8 days, a head capsule width of 3.0–3.2 millimeters, and a body length of 35–46 millimeters. The larvae are generally colored brownish-gray to grayish-black, with a distinctive yellow or white spot on the dorsal side of their first four to six abdominal segments. Additionally, P. saucia larvae have a black W-shaped mark on the 8th abdominal segment of their sixth instar and a black line laterally above their spiracles. The head of the larvae is generally orange-brown with darker spots.

=== Pupa ===
The pupal stage of P. saucia lasts for an average of 33 days at colder temperatures (15 °C) and 13 days at warmer temperatures (25 °C). The developmental threshold for the pupa is 4.3–8.5 °C. The pupa is 15–23 millimeters long and 5–6 millimeters wide, and mahogany brown in color. Larvae dig a small hole in the soil and pupate near the soil surface.

=== Adult ===
The adult moth is fairly large, with a wingspan of 43–50 millimeters. The front wings of P. saucia are grayish-brown with a red undertone, with darker brown shades centrally and along the edges. The wings have seven short, black marks, a distinctive feature of the moth. The moth's hindwings are either opalescent or white with brown veins and brown shading on the edges. The head and thorax of the moth are dark brown, with a lighter brown abdomen.

The subspecies margaritosa includes the more strongly marked and varied specimens, wholly grey in color. Ab. majuscula is fuscous black, while ab. nigrocosta is greyish fuscous, sometimes tinged with reddish or ochreous, with a broad black shade along the costal area which sometimes encloses the stigmata. On the contrary, ab. ochreacosta has the inner marginal area darker while the whole costal area is pale. Ab. rufa and brunnea are mere color varieties.

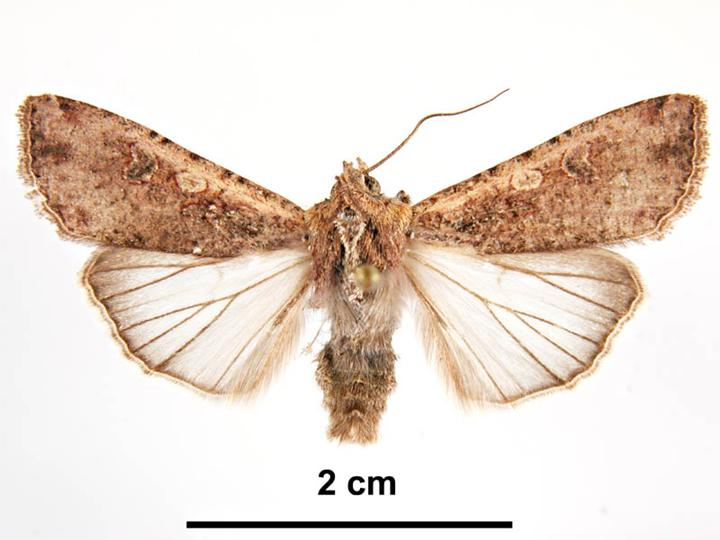
Dorsal view of male

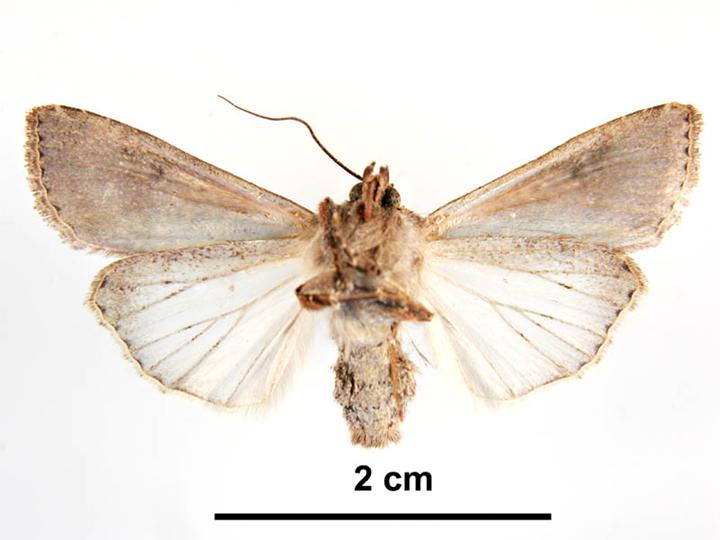
Ventral view of male

== Migration ==
=== Regional dispersal ===
The variegated cutworm overwinters both as larvae and as adults. However, studies show the moth cannot survive at any stage of life for more than eight weeks at 0 °C, and more than 4 weeks at −2 °C. These data suggest the moth does not overwinter in the cold northern Canadian extent of their geographic range. The moth flies in several generations from May to November depending on the location. The moth moves from southwest to northeast in the warmer months. The common infestations seen in the spring are believed to be because of the migration of adults returning to the north from overwintering areas in the Southern United States. Under unfavorable conditions, moth migration has been seen to decrease. The complete overwintering range is unknown, but it is suggested to be from the lower Mississippi valley to the southern Great Plains.

=== Local dispersal ===
Additionally, the P. saucia larvae have been observed to move into army-worm habits, meaning they travel in great numbers from field to field. Through this process, the larvae destroy vegetation and crops as they move.

== Enemies ==
=== Predators ===
The variegated cutworm has a number of predators. Wasp and fly parasitoids account for most of the larval deaths each year. Braconidae, Ichneumonidae, Eulophidae, Tachinidae species have been observed as attacking P. saucia larvae. Some of the most common organisms that attack the larvae include: Apanteles xylinus, Chelonus insularis, Chelonus militaris, Meteorus autographae, Meteorus leviventris, Microplitis feltiae, Rogas perplexus, Rogas rufocoxalis, Campoletis sonorensis, Enicospilus merdarius, Nepiera fuscifemora, Ophion flavidus, Dibrachys canus, Archytas aterrimus, Archytas cirphis, Bonnetia comta, Carcelia spp., Chaetogaedia monticola, Clausicela opaca, Eucelatoria armigera, Euphorocera claripennis, Euphorocera omissa, Gonia longipulvilli, Gonia porca, Gonia sequax, Lespesia archippivora, Madremyia saundersii, Peleteria texensis, Periscepsia helymus, Periscepsia laevigata, Voria ruralis, Winthemia leucanae, Winthemia quadripustulata, Winthemia rufopicta. It is also likely that many other species of wasps and flies attack P. saucia.

=== Parasites ===
The Winthemia rufopicta, Voria ruralis, Archytas apicifer, Lespesia archippivora, Apanteles marginiventris, Campoletis sonorensis, and Peleteria texensis are species that have been found to parasitize P. saucia. However, one study in Oklahoma showed that the P. saucia was parasitized early in the season until larvae of other species became available for parasitism. Although parasitism does occur, it does not have a large enough effect to act as a method of natural control.

== Mating ==
=== Pheromones ===
The female moth produces a sex pheromone to attract male mates. The female variegated cutworm has pheromone glands in their terminal abdominal segments. The major component in the pheromone is (Z)-11-hexadecenyl acetate, and the minor component is (Z)-9-tetradecenyl acetate in a 3:1 ratio.

== Interactions with humans ==
=== Pest of crop plants ===
The variegated cutworm is described by many as one of the most damaging pest of vegetables. The moth causes damage by cutting off the plant at the surface of the soil, immediately destroying the crop. The larvae themselves are defoliators. They strip the leaves and fruit from a tree and eat the buds and stems. These larvae are common in low-growing herbage, but what makes them especially dangerous to crops is their ability to climb trees to feed on foliage. Most of the damage to crops is done in the warm months. Damage can happen extremely quickly, with entire gardens and fields being destroyed in a matter of days. At around the beginning of August, when the temperature begins to drop, the damage begins to decrease and P. saucia begins to disappear from gardens and fields.

=== Pest control ===
There are many different methods of pest control that are taken to contain the damage done by P. saucia on gardens and crops. Insecticides are often used to reduce damage done by larvae to crop plants. Another common method is to clean gardens. Removing weeds and rubbish from gardens reduces the number of variegated cutworm larvae in the area. Additionally, digging a ditch or trench with perpendicular walls helps to contain the larvae. The larvae are known to march in army-worm styles at high densities, and digging a trench about 12 inches deep in their line of march has been shown to be effective. Painting tar or pitch around the tree is effective for a short time, but a fresh coat must be applied every few days. Tying a narrow band of cotton around the tree with twine is also effective until it becomes wet. Smaller plants are more liable to damage, so it is recommended to wrap the stem of these plants with smooth paper to prevent larvae from climbing the plants. Lastly, placing poultry in the gardens helps control the pest. Turkey and guinea hens tend to seek out P. saucia larvae and pupae.
