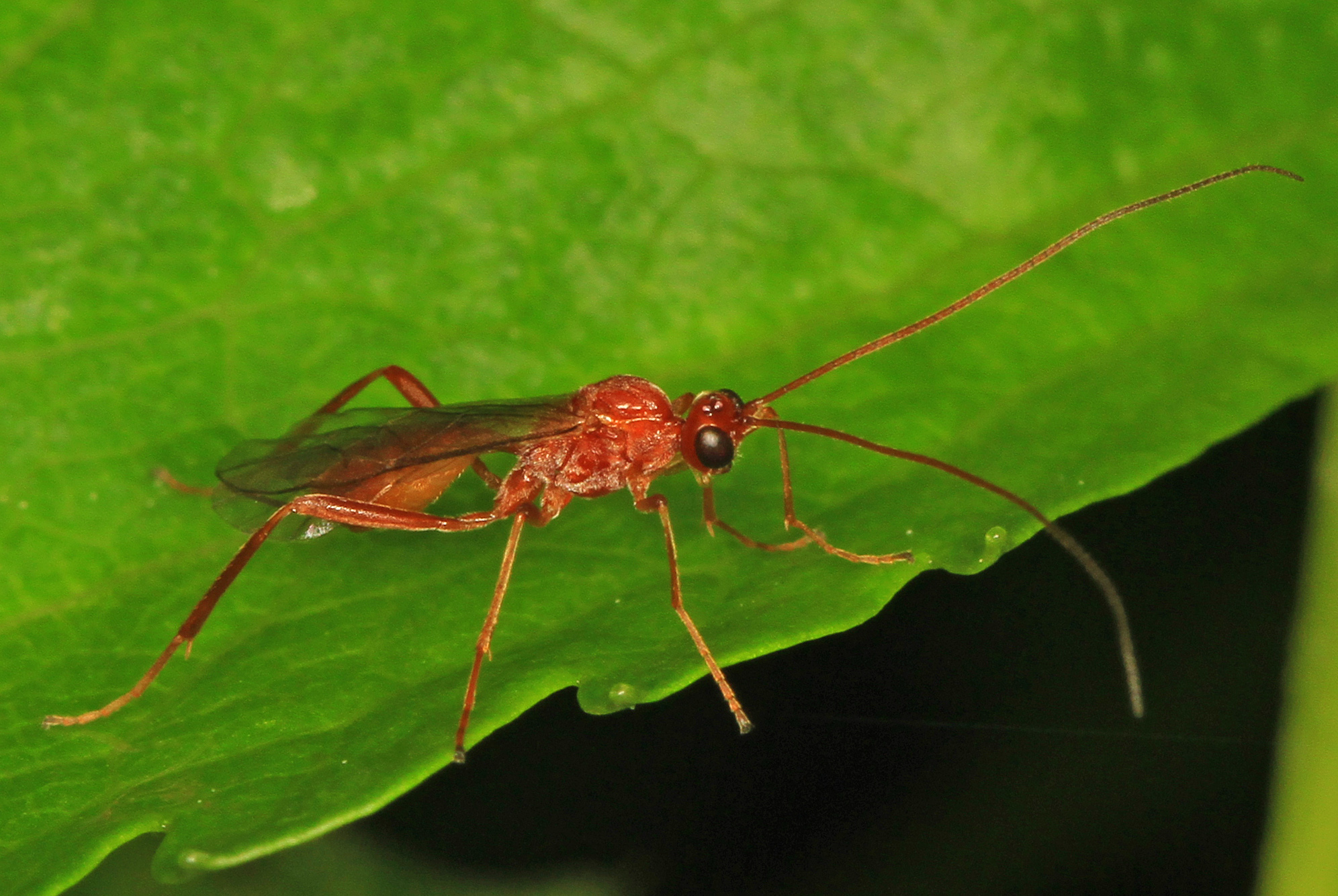
- Meteorus sp.

Scientific classification
- Kingdom: Animalia
- Phylum: Arthropoda
- Class: Insecta
- Order: Hymenoptera
- Family: Braconidae
- Subfamily: Meteorinae; Cresson, 1887

= Meteorinae =

Subfamily of wasps

Meteorinae is a subfamily of braconid parasitoid wasps; however, since 2015, most scientists have treated this clade as the Tribe Meteorini in Euphorinae. Several species have been used in biological control programs. The name for this group comes from the pupal stage, which, in species attacking Lepidopteran hosts, hangs suspended from a long thread of silk.

== Description and distribution ==
Meteorines are characterized by an open 1st subdiscal cell and a four-sided 2nd subdiscal cell of the forewings. They have a distinctive petiolate waist.

They are found worldwide, in habitats where their hosts can be found.

== Biology ==
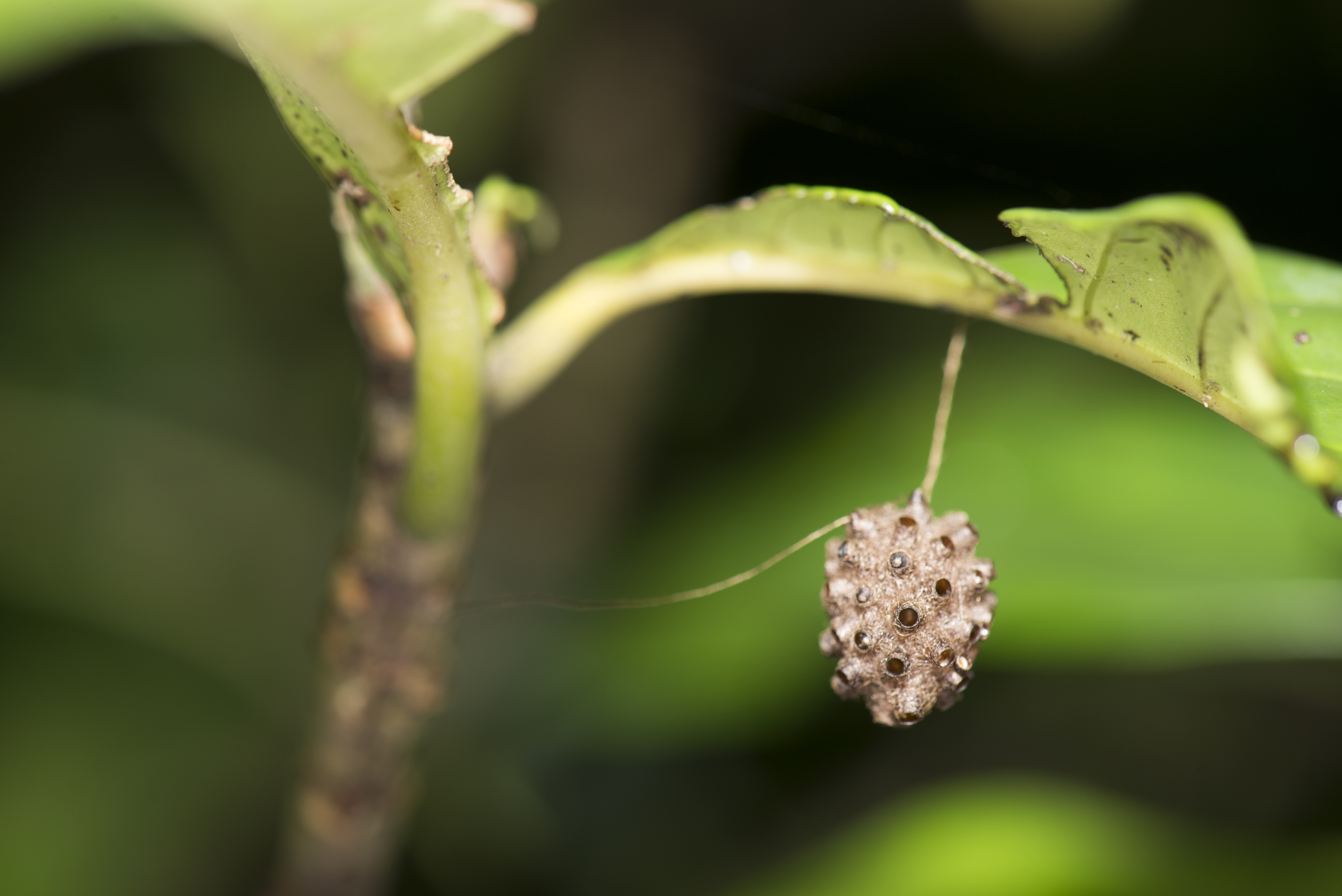
A hanging cocoon mass created by many individual larvae of a gregarous species of Meteorus.

Meteorines are koinobiont endoparasitiods of Coleoptera or Lepidoptera larvae. Some species are known to have broad host ranges, meaning they can attack many species of hosts. Most are solitary, laying a single egg per host, but some are gregarious and many larvae develop within a single host. Many species are nocturnal as adults.

== Genera ==
Two genera are found in North America, Meteorus and Zele. Recent evidence suggests that Meteorus may be paraphyletic with respect to Zele, but synonymyzing the two genera could potentially cause great confusion in the scientific literature.

== Use in biological control ==
Many hosts of Meteorines are considered pests, especially of forests, making them good candidates for biocontrol projects. Meteorus pulchricornus has been imported to North America on multiple occasions to attempt to control the gypsy moth. M. vesicolor was introduced to the United States in the early 1900s for the control of the brown-tail moth. M. trachynotus was investigated for control of spruce budworm as was M. hypophloei for controlling bark beetles. Other species have been used in control of cutworms, avocado looper, and swallowtail pests on citrus crops.
