= Euphorini =

Scientific classification
- Domain: Eukaryota
- Kingdom: Animalia
- Phylum: Arthropoda
- Class: Insecta
- Order: Hymenoptera
- Family: Braconidae
- Subfamily: Euphorinae
- Tribe: Euphorini; Shaw, 1985

Genera
- Leiophron; Mama; Peristenus

Tribe of wasps

Euphorini is a tribe of braconid wasps in the subfamily Euphorinae.
