= Meteorus hyphantriae =

Scientific classification
- Domain: Eukaryota
- Kingdom: Animalia
- Phylum: Arthropoda
- Class: Insecta
- Order: Hymenoptera
- Family: Braconidae
- Genus: Meteorus
- Species: M. hyphantriae

Binomial name
- Meteorus hyphantriae Riley, 1887

Species of wasp

Meteorus hyphantriae is a species of parasitoid wasp in the family Braconidae and subfamily. As part of the Meteorus, it is also a part of the subfamily Euphorinae and the tribe Meteorini.

== Ecology ==
As a parasitoid, part of the lifecycle of M. hyphantriae is dependent on development in a host. It has been found to have multiple hosts. These include Hyphantria cunea (the fall webworm), Malacosoma americana (Eastern tent caterpillar), Malacosoma disstria (Forest tent caterpillar moth), Drasteria erechtea, Meliana albilinea (Wheat-head army-worm), Acronicta ovata and others.
