= PBAN =

PBAN may refer to these articles:

- Pheromone biosynthesis activating neuropeptide
- Polybutadiene acrylonitrile
