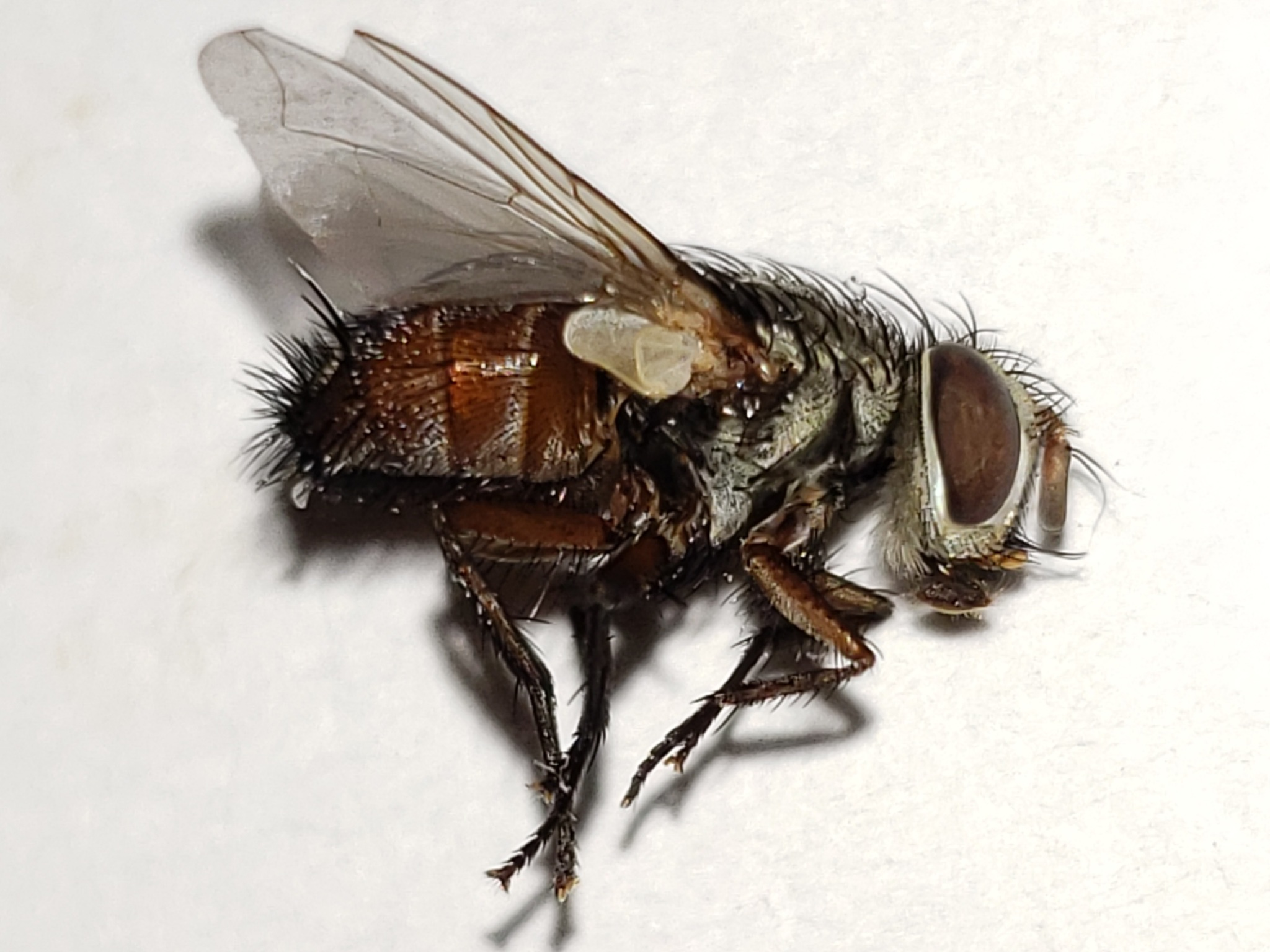
- Lespesia rubripes

Scientific classification
- Kingdom: Animalia
- Phylum: Arthropoda
- Clade: Pancrustacea
- Class: Insecta
- Order: Diptera
- Family: Tachinidae
- Subfamily: Exoristinae
- Tribe: Eryciini
- Genus: Lespesia; Robineau-Desvoidy, 1863

Type species
- Achaetoneura anisotae Webber, 1930

Synonyms
- List: Achaetoneura Brauer & von Berganstamm, 1891; Achaetoneuropsis Townsend, 1927; Euparafrontina Brèthes, 1917; Gymnoerycia Townsend, 1916; Masiceropsis Townsend, 1916; Myiosturmia Townsend, 1927; Parafrontina Brauer & von Berganstamm, 1893; Prophryno Townsend, 1927; Rileyella Townsend, 1909; Sturmiopsoidea Thompson, 1966; Ypophaemyia Townsend, 1916; Zygofrontina Townsend, 1915; Zygofrontinopsis Blanchard, 1959

= Lespesia =

Genus of flies

Lespesia is a genus of flies in the family Tachinidae.

== Species ==
- Lespesia affinis (Townsend, 1927)
- Lespesia afra (Wulp, 1888)
- Lespesia aletiae (Riley, 1879)
- Lespesia andina (Bigot, 1888)
- Lespesia anisotae (Webber, 1930)
- Lespesia anonyma (Riley, 1872)
- Lespesia apicalis (Wulp, 1890)
- Lespesia archippivora (Riley, 1871)
- Lespesia auriceps (Macquart, 1844)
- Lespesia aurulans (Townsend, 1927)
- Lespesia barbatula (Wulp, 1890)
- Lespesia bigeminata (Curran, 1927)
- Lespesia brasiliensis (Townsend, 1917)
- Lespesia callosamiae Beneway, 1963
- Lespesia capitis (Townsend, 1915)
- Lespesia clavipalpis Thompson, 1966
- Lespesia cuculliae (Webber, 1930)
- Lespesia danai (Townsend, 1940)
- Lespesia datanarum (Townsend, 1892)
- Lespesia dubia (Williston, 1889)
- Lespesia erythrocauda (Curran, 1934)
- Lespesia euchaetiae (Webber, 1930)
- Lespesia fasciagaster Beneway, 1963
- Lespesia ferruginea (Reinhard, 1924)
- Lespesia flavifrons Beneway, 1963
- Lespesia frenchii (Williston, 1889)
- Lespesia fulvipalpis (Bigot, 1889)
- Lespesia grioti (Blanchard, 1963)
- Lespesia halisidotae (Aldrich& Webber, 1924)
- Lespesia lanei Guimarães, 1983
- Lespesia laniferae (Webber, 1930)
- Lespesia lata (Wiedemann, 1830)
- Lespesia leliae Cortés & Campos, 1971
- Lespesia marginalis (Aldrich & Webber, 1924)
- Lespesia martinezi (Brèthes, 1917)
- Lespesia melalophae (Allen, 1926)
- Lespesia mendesi (Townsend, 1940)
- Lespesia nimia Cortés & Campos, 1971
- Lespesia obscurus (Bigot, 1857)
- Lespesia parva Beneway, 1963
- Lespesia parviteres (Aldrich & Webber, 1924)
- Lespesia pholi (Webber, 1930)
- Lespesia pilatei (Coquillett, 1897)
- Lespesia plaumanni Guimarães, 1983
- Lespesia pollinosa Thompson, 1966
- Lespesia protoginoi (Blanchard, 1966)
- Lespesia rectinervis (Wulp, 1890)
- Lespesia rileyi (Williston, 1889)
- Lespesia rubra (Townsend, 1916)
- Lespesia rubripes Sabrosky, 1980
- Lespesia rufifrons (Röder, 1885)
- Lespesia rufomaculata (Blanchard, 1963)
- Lespesia samiae (Webber, 1930)
- Lespesia schizurae (Townsend, 1891)
- Lespesia spitzi Guimarães, 1983
- Lespesia stonei Sabrosky, 1977
- Lespesia teixeirai Guimarães, 1983
- Lespesia testacea (Webber, 1930)
- Lespesia texana (Webber, 1930)
- Lespesia thompsoni O'Hara & Thompson, 2021
- Lespesia travassosi Guimarães, 1983
- Lespesia westonia (Webber, 1930)
- Lespesia williamsoni (Blanchard, 1959)
- Lespesia xychus (Walker, 1849)
