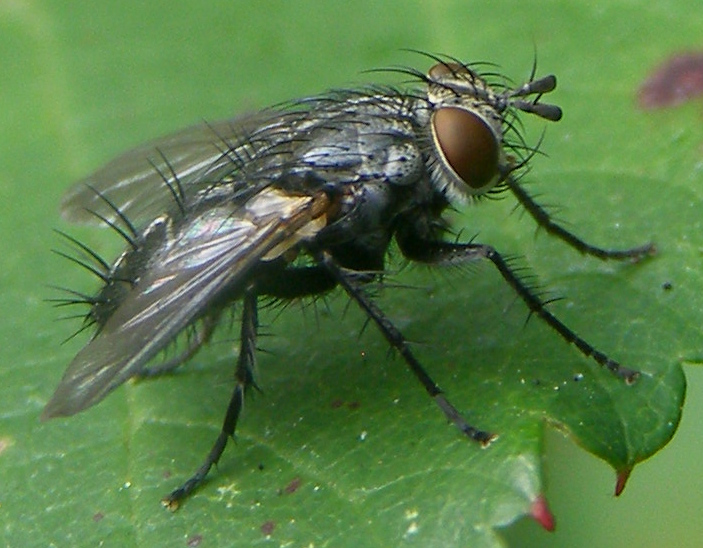
- Voria ruralis

Scientific classification
- Kingdom: Animalia
- Phylum: Arthropoda
- Class: Insecta
- Order: Diptera
- Family: Tachinidae
- Subfamily: Dexiinae
- Tribe: Voriini
- Genus: Voria; Robineau-Desvoidy, 1830

Type species
- Tachina ruralis Fallén, 1810

Synonyms
- Afrovoria Curran, 1938; Anavoria Mesnil, 1953; Hystricovoria Townsend, 1928; Itavoria Townsend, 1931; Plagia Meigen, 1838; Xenoplagia Townsend, 1914

= Voria =

Genus of insects

Voria is a genus of flies in the family Tachinidae.

== Species ==
- Voria aurescens (Townsend, 1931)
- Voria aurifrons (Townsend, 1892)
- Voria capensis Villeneuve, 1935
- Voria ciliata d'Aguilar, 1957
- Voria erasmocoronadoi Fleming & Wood, 2017
- Voria micronychia Zhao & Zhou, 1993
- Voria parva (Johnson, 1920)
- Voria pollyclari (Rocha-e-Silva, Lopes & Della Lucia, 1999)
- Voria ruralis (Fallén, 1810)
- Voria setosa (Townsend, 1914)
