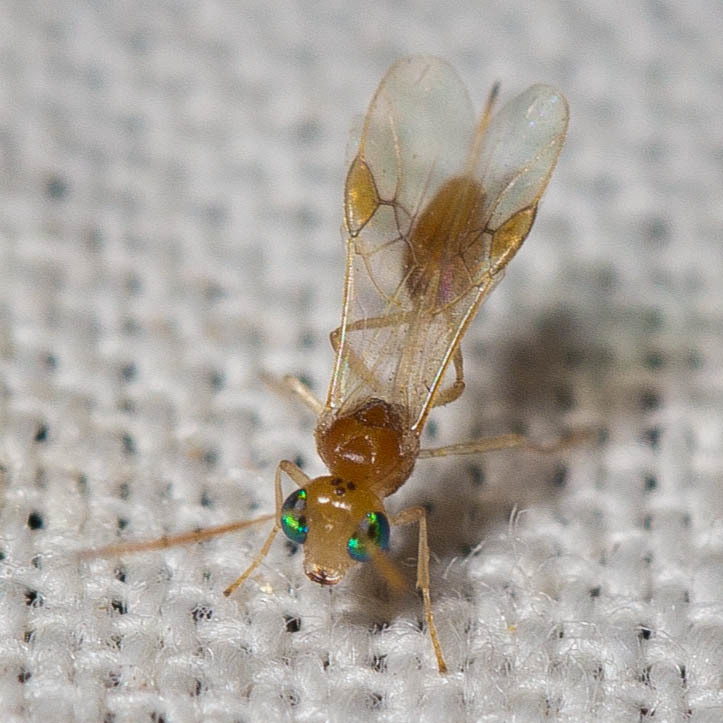
- Chrysopophthorus americanus, California

Scientific classification
- Kingdom: Animalia
- Phylum: Arthropoda
- Clade: Pancrustacea
- Class: Insecta
- Order: Hymenoptera
- Family: Braconidae
- Subfamily: Euphorinae
- Genus: Chrysopophthorus; Goidanich, 1948

= Chrysopophthorus =

Genus of wasps

Chrysopophthorus is a genus of wasp in the family Braconidae. There are about eight described species in Chrysopophthorus.

== Species ==
These eight species belong to the genus Chrysopophthorus:

- Chrysopophthorus americanus Mason, 1964
- Chrysopophthorus brasileanus Mason, 1964
- Chrysopophthorus caribbeanus Mason, 1964
- Chrysopophthorus hageni Austin & Wharton, 1992
- Chrysopophthorus hungaricus (Kiss, 1927)
- Chrysopophthorus orientalis Mason, 1964
- Chrysopophthorus petiolus Chou, 1986
- Chrysopophthorus tropicalis Mason, 1964
