= Peristenus pseudopallipes =

Scientific classification
- Kingdom: Animalia
- Phylum: Arthropoda
- Class: Insecta
- Order: Hymenoptera
- Family: Braconidae
- Genus: Peristenus
- Species: P. pseudopallipes

Binomial name
- Peristenus pseudopallipes

Species of wasp

Peristenus pseudopallipes is a parasitoid, which lives within a host as part of its life cycle. It then emerges from the host organism, killing the host.

== Characteristics ==
There are three distinct larval stages. The first larval stage is a caudate-mandibulate type. The second larval stage is an acaudate and lives in the host haemocoele. The third larval stage is also acaudate and eventually emerges from the host organism. The pupa diapauses in a cocoon. In the laboratory, adults live for about 16 days and lays eggs in the host abdomen.

P. pseudopallipes has cytochrome C oxidase, a key component in the respiratory chain reaction for the reduction of oxygen into water.

P. pseudopallipes has olfactory responses to the odors of some food plants of its host. The attractive odor comes from the flowers. Responsiveness was shown to be related to the number of eggs in their ovaries. P. pseudopallipes was shown to have high attraction to the flowers of Erigeron spp. and these flowers were also preferred for feeding.

== Parasitism ==
P. pseudopallipes infects the nymphal stage of Lygus lineolaris between the end of July and the beginning of August. This usually occurs in fields of Erigeron, which act as a nectar source for the host. The P. pseudopallipes female will lay an egg in the hemolymph of the L. lineolaris nymph. There, three instars of P. pseudopallipes will develop. After the P. pseudopallipes larvae emerge, the host will persist for a few hours or days. The larvae will weave a cocoon and emerge fourteen days later as an adult. However, the parasite may remain in diapause for one year to reemerge in the spring.

== Host competition ==
P. pseudopallipes is one of four parasites known to attack L. lineolaris. The other three are Peristenus stygicus, P. digoneutis, P. pallipes.

== Biocontrol ==
Host L. lineolaris feeds on over 300 plant species and causes at least two billion dollars in losses per year. Because P. pseudopallipes and other genus members cause host death shortly after hatching, introducing Peristenus spp. to fields has been considered to control the L. lineolaris population.
