= Syntretini =

Scientific classification
- Domain: Eukaryota
- Kingdom: Animalia
- Phylum: Arthropoda
- Class: Insecta
- Order: Hymenoptera
- Family: Braconidae
- Subfamily: Euphorinae
- Tribe: Syntretini; Shaw, 1985

Genera
- Bracteodes; Prosyntretus; Sculptosyntretus; Syntretellus; Syntretomorpha; Syntretoriana; Syntretus

Tribe of wasps

Syntretini is a tribe of parasitic wasps in the subfamily Euphorinae.
