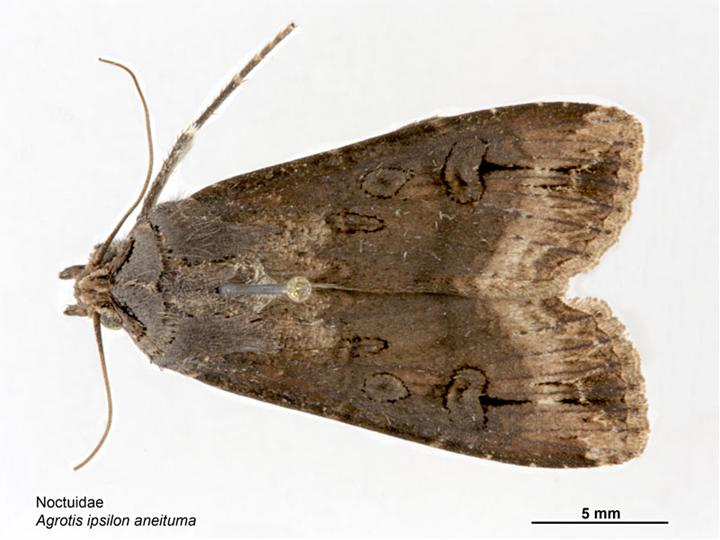

Conservation status
- Least Concern (IUCN 3.1) (Europe regional assessment)

- Secure (NatureServe)

Scientific classification
- Kingdom: Animalia
- Phylum: Arthropoda
- Clade: Pancrustacea
- Class: Insecta
- Order: Lepidoptera
- Superfamily: Noctuoidea
- Family: Noctuidae
- Genus: Agrotis
- Species: A. ipsilon

Binomial name
- Agrotis ipsilon (Hufnagel, 1766)

Synonyms
- Phalaena ipsilon Hufnagel, 1766; Noctua suffusa (Denis & Schiffermüller, 1775); Noctua ypsilon (von Rottemburg, 1776); Phalaena idonea Cramer, 1780; Bombyx spinula Esper, 1786; Agrotis spinifera Villers, 1789; Phalaena spinula Donovan, 1801; Agrotis telifera Harris, 1841; Agrotis bipars Walker, 1857; Agrotis frivola Wallengren, 1860; Agrotis aneituma Walker, 1865; Agrotis pepoli Bertolini, 1874; Agrotis aureolum Schaus, 1898

= Agrotis ipsilon =

Species of moth

Agrotis ipsilon, the dark sword-grass, ipsilon dart, black cutworm, greasy cutworm or floodplain cutworm, is a small noctuid moth found worldwide. The moth gets its scientific name from black markings on its forewings shaped like the letter "Y" or the Greek letter upsilon. The larvae are known as "cutworms" because they cut plants and other crops. The larvae are serious agricultural pests and feed on nearly all varieties of vegetables and many important grains.

This species is a seasonal migrant that travels north in the spring and south in the fall to escape extreme temperatures in the summer and winter. The migration patterns reflect how reproduction occurs in the spring and ceases in the fall.

Females release sex pheromones to attract males for mating. Pheromone production and release in females and pheromone responsiveness in males is dependent on the juvenile hormone (JH) and pheromone biosynthesis activating neuropeptide (BPAN). In the span of 2 months, the moth progresses through the life cycle stages egg, larvae, pupa, and adult. Throughout this time period, this moth faces the risk of predation and parasitism, such as by Hexamermis arvalis or by the parasite Archytas cirphis.

== Description ==
38–48 millimetres (1.5–1.9 in). Antennae in male bipectinated. Forewings brown, reddish-tinged, mixed with pale greyish-ochreous, costa and sometimes median area suffused with dark fuscous; first and second lines edged with dark fuscous; spots outlined with black, reniform followed by a short black dash; subterminal line obscure, usually preceded in middle by two fine black marks. Hindwings whitish-grey or whitish, terminally suffused with fuscous. Larva ochreous brownish or bronzy-grey, sides sometimes greenish; dorsal, subdorsal, and spiracular lines faintly darker or lighter, usually darker-edged; head suffusedly brown-marked.

== Geographic range ==
Populations of this species have been found in southern Canada, 48 of the United States (and additionally Hawaii), Mexico, Central and South America, Australia, New Zealand, the Pacific Rim, North Africa, Europe, and Asia. However, they are absent from some tropical regions and colder areas and are more widespread in the Northern than Southern Hemisphere.

This species is also known to migrate north in the spring and migrate south in the fall.

== Food resources ==
=== Caterpillars ===
Larvae feed on weeds such as bluegrass, curled dock, lambsquarters, yellow rocket, and redroot pigweed. They will often eat all the weeds available before moving to attacking crops. Favored crops include most vegetable plants, alfalfa, clover, cotton, rice, sorghum, strawberry, sugarbeet, tobacco, and occasionally grains and grasses.

=== Adults ===
Adults feed on flower nectar. They are also attracted to deciduous trees and shrubs such as linden, wild plum, crabapple, and lilac. They are a pollinator of fetterbush lyonia.

== Parental care ==
=== Oviposition ===
Based on the types of debris on the ground, the black cutworm prefers to oviposit in areas with fencerow (pasture) debris rather than corn field debris, woodland floor debris, and bare soil. Fencerow debris includes dry grass debris, and this may be attractive for females to oviposit early in the spring before rapid vegetation growth occurs.

After this growth, though, the moths are drawn more to low, dense plants such as the curled dock and yellow rocket. These plants have multiple stems and many low-lying basal leaves. On most plant species, the cutworm prefers to oviposit on the leaves rather than the stem.

== Life history ==
=== Life cycle ===
In a given year, the number of generations differs based on location and weather conditions. In Canada, there are 1 or 2 generations, while in the United States, there are 2 to 4 per year. This species is abundant in warmer temperatures (such as Arkansas, US) during the late spring in May–June and early fall in September and October, while they are more abundant in cooler temperatures (such as New York, US) during the summer in June and July. One life cycle lasts between 35–60 days.

==== Egg ====
The egg stage lasts 3 to 6 days. Females oviposit eggs in clusters on low-lying leaves. If such host plants are not available, the females will oviposit on dead plant material. However, they will not lay eggs on bare soil. Females can deposit eggs singly, or in groups of up to 1200 to 1900 eggs.

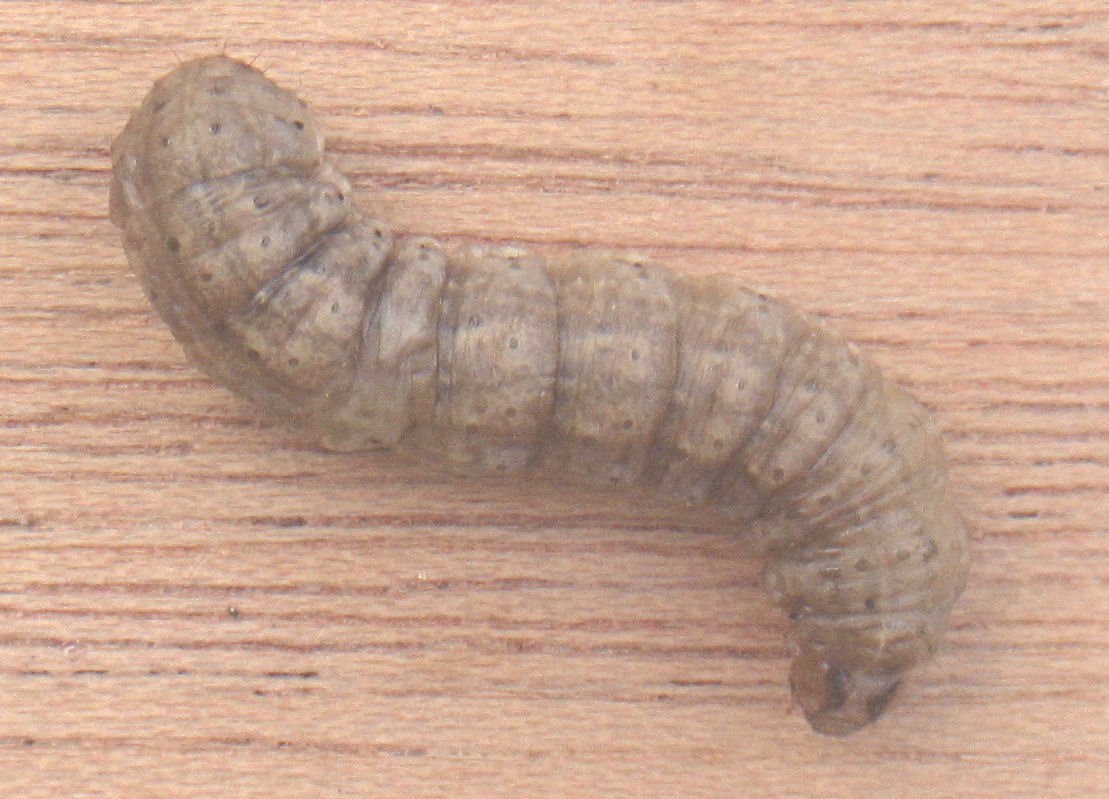
Caterpillar

The nearly spherical eggs are initially white but turn brown with age. The surface of the egg possesses 35–40 ribs that radiate from one apex.

==== Caterpillar ====
The larval stage lasts 20–40 days. Over the span of 5 to 9 instars, the caterpillar body grows from 3.5 mm to a maximum of 55 mm. Larval development is optimized at a temperature of 27 degrees Celsius, and instars 1–5 are most successful at higher humidities. By the 4th instar, the larva becomes light sensitive and spends most of the daylight underground. The larvae are considered pests because they damage the plant tissue under the soil. The larvae are cannibalistic.

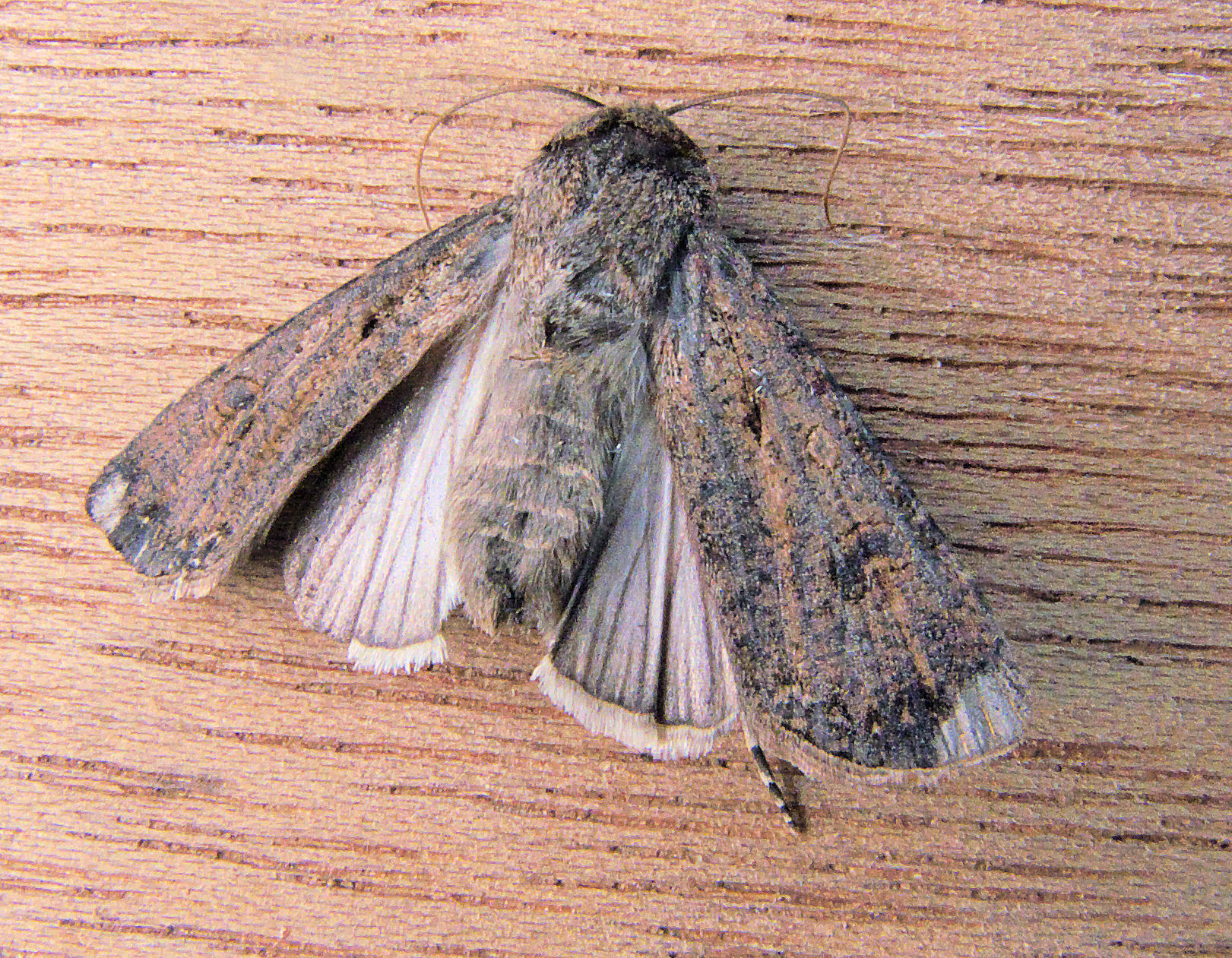
Adult

The larva can range in color from light gray or gray brown to black. The ventral side is usually lighter, and this species does not have a dorsal band. The entire body is covered with granules and the head possesses many dark spots.

==== Pupa ====
The pupal stage lasts 12–20 days. This species pupates under the soil approximately 3–12 mm below the surface.

The pupae appear to be dark brown and are 17–12 mm long and 5–6 mm wide.

==== Adult ====
One complete generation from egg to adult lasts 35–60 days. The female preoviposition period lasts 7–10 days.

Adults have a wingspan of 40–55 mm. The forewings are dark brown, and the distal area has a light irregular band a black dash mark. The hindwings are whitish to gray and have darker colored veins.

== Migration ==
A. ipsilon are seasonal migratory insects that travel south in the fall to escape harsh cold temperatures and travel north in the spring to escape extremely warm weather. Therefore, changes in thermoperiod as well as photoperiod may influence the onset of migration patterns in this species. Before migration southward in the fall, the reproductive system in both females and males shuts down to prevent copulation before winter. In the spring and early summer, though, before migration north, females release sex pheromones soon after eclosion. In one study, female moths collected from late April to early May were 100% mated.

== Enemies ==
=== Predators ===
Several species of wasps prey on the black cutworm. Larvae parasitized by Meteorus leviventris, a type of parasitoid, eat 24% less vegetation and cut 36% fewer seedlings. Other parasitoids include several fly species such as Archytas cirphis, Bonnetia comta, Gonia sequax, Eucelatoria armigera and Sisyropa eudryae. Ground beetles also eat black cutworm larvae. Ants, specifically Lasius neoniger also prey on this species and feed on A. ipsilon eggs.

=== Parasites ===
An entomopathogenic nematode called Hexamermis arvalis is known to infect 60% of larvae in the central United States. This parasite ultimately kills the insect. The parasite thrives in moist soil conditions.

== Mating ==
=== Female calling behavior ===
Calling behavior is the act of females releasing sex pheromones in preparation for mating. Calling behavior increases within the first three days after eclosion but decreases as the females grow older. As well, as the females grow older, the onset time of calling behavior occurs earlier. Calling earlier allows older females to have increased mating success as they normally produce less sex pheromone and need to appear more attractive than younger females. The amount of sex pheromone in the body and calling behavior are coordinated on a time scale.

=== Pheromone biosynthesis activating neuropeptide ===
Females produce a sex pheromone in the pheromone gland on their abdominal tips that attracts males for mating. Biosynthesis of the sex pheromone is controlled by a neurohormone called pheromone biosynthesis activating neuropeptide (PBAN). This 33-amino-acid-long peptide is present in both sexes in the brain-suboesophageal ganglions (Br-SOG) during both scotophase and photophase. It has been shown that the juvenile hormone is involved in the release of PBAN in both males and females. PBAN aids in pheromone production in females and pheromone responsiveness in males. In another species, PBAN release has been shown to be stimulated by external factors including photoperiod, temperature and odorants from host plants

=== Juvenile hormone ===
The juvenile hormone (JH), released by the corpora allata (CA), is necessary for the production and release of the sex pheromone. The CA releases JH which acts on the production/release of the PBAN-like factor. So, PBAN is what connects the network in the CA to the central nervous system's production of sex pheromone. When the CA was removed, calling behavior and sex pheromone production stopped. As well, ovaries remained underdeveloped when the CA was absent. However, when decapitated females (meaning complete absence of the CA) were injected with a synthetic form of JH, ovaries were able to develop. This indicates that JH acts on the ovaries and production of sex pheromone in two independent neuroendocrine systems.

In males, JH is necessary for pheromone responsiveness. When the CA was removed, males did not respond to female sex pheromones with sexual behavior. However, when the CA was implanted back, responsiveness and sexual behavior returned.

== Physiology ==
=== Olfaction ===
A. ipsilon has a sensitive olfactory system with many proteins that are expressed in the antennae. Such proteins include odorant binding proteins (OBPs), chemosensory proteins (CSPs), odorant receptors (ORs), ionotropic receptors (IRs) and sensory neuron membrane proteins (SNMPs). These proteins are responsible for recognizing sex pheromone and general odorants, such as those released by host plants.

== Agricultural Pest ==
Each larva can consume over 400 square centimetres of foliage during its development. They feed above ground until about the fourth instar. After that they do considerable damage to crops by severing young plants at ground level. In the midwestern US, the black cutworm is considered to be a serious pest of corn. Corn is very susceptible at the one-leaf stage, but by the four- or five-leaf stage, it is relatively unaffected. Damage to the underground parts of plants can also be harmful. Other crops where serious damage occurs include cotton, maize, tobacco, sunflower, tomatoes, sugar beet and potato.

=== Management ===
There are three options to manage cutworm population and the incurred damages. Soil insecticides can be applied as a pre-plant treatment, although this may be limited by the unpredictability of cutworm population density distribution. These insecticides can also be applied as a planting-time treatment, although the same limitations still hold. The third option would be a rescue treatment that is applied after the infestations have occurred; this is also called the wait-and-see system. This may also be preferable due to a recently lower occurrence of outbreaks.

== See also ==
- Army cutworm (Euxoa auxiliaris)
- Variegated cutworm (Peridroma saucia)
- Brown cutworm (Agrotis munda)
