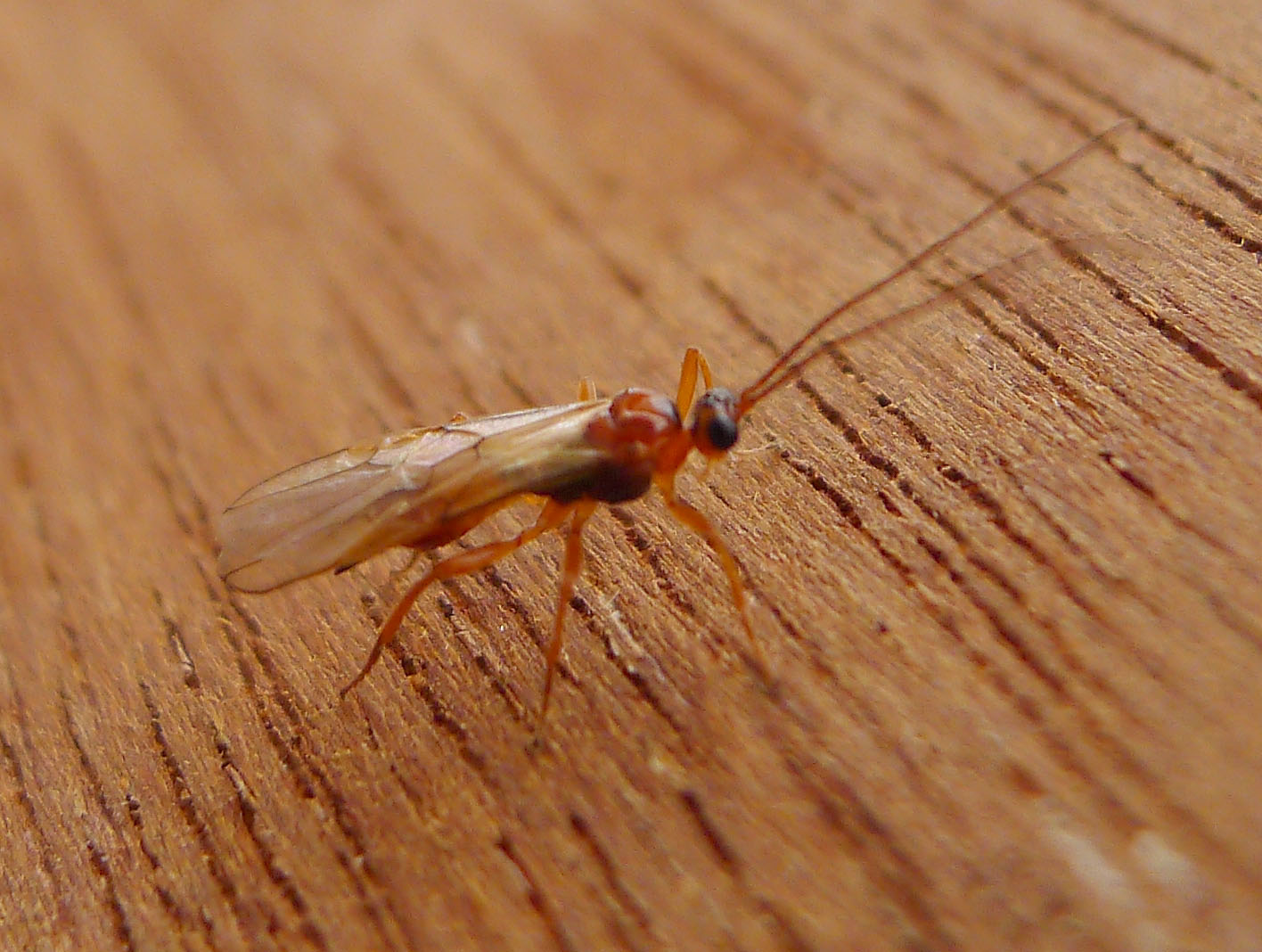

Scientific classification
- Kingdom: Animalia
- Phylum: Arthropoda
- Class: Insecta
- Order: Hymenoptera
- Family: Braconidae
- Subfamily: Euphorinae
- Genus: Pygostolus; Haliday

= Pygostolus =

Genus of wasps

Pygostolus is a genus of wasp in the family Braconidae. There are about eight described species in Pygostolus.

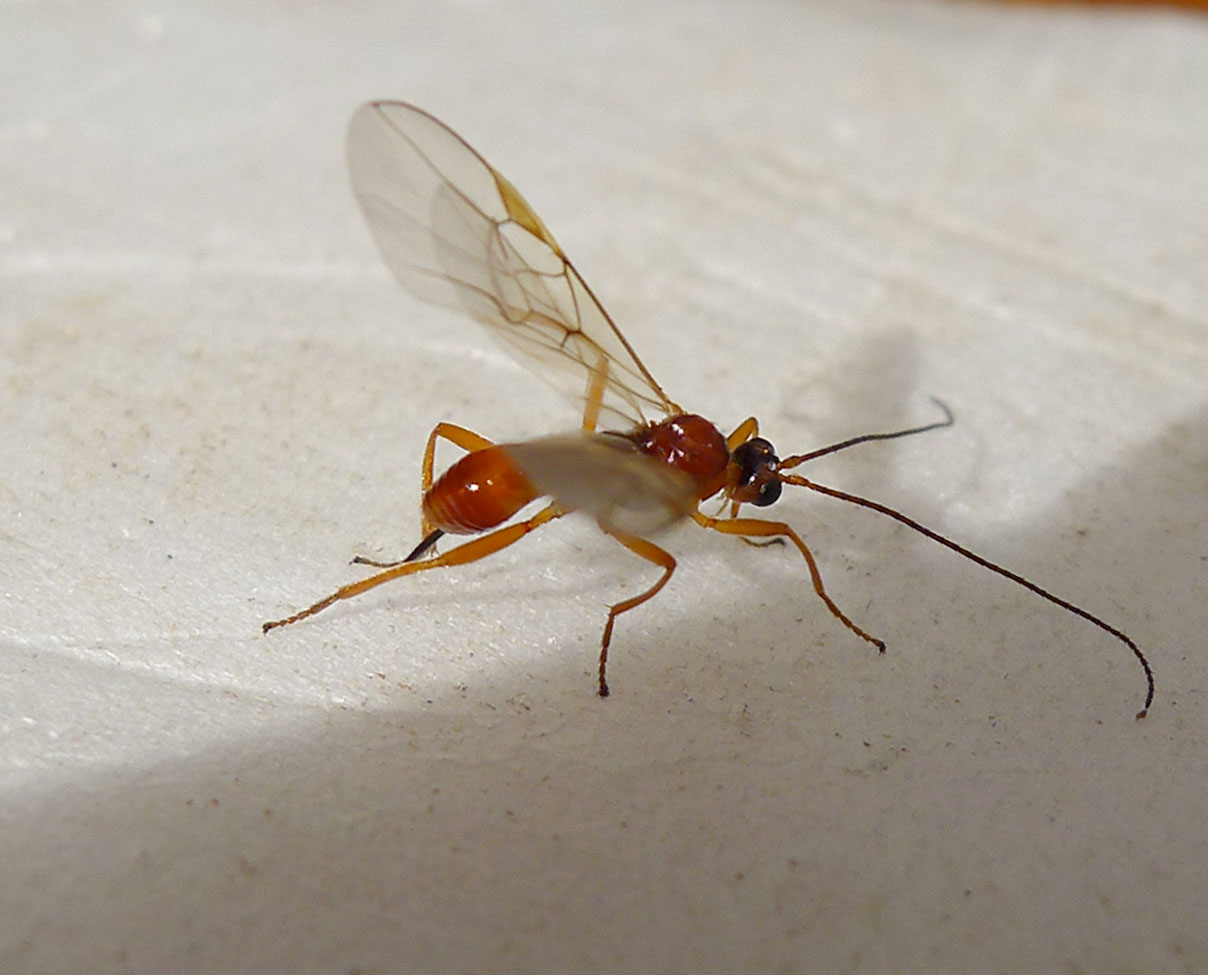

== Species ==
These eight species belong to the genus Pygostolus:

- Pygostolus clavatus Brues, 1933^{c g}
- Pygostolus falcatus (Nees, 1834)^{c g}
- Pygostolus minax Belokobylskij, 2000^{c g}
- Pygostolus multiarticulatus (Ratzeburg, 1852)^{c g}
- Pygostolus patriarchicus Brues, 1937^{c g}
- Pygostolus sonorensis Cameron, 1887^{c g}
- Pygostolus sticticus (Fabricius, 1798)^{c g}
- Pygostolus tibetensis Chen & van Achterberg, 1997^{c g}

Data sources: i = ITIS, c = Catalogue of Life, g = GBIF, b = Bugguide.net
