= Voria aurifrons =

Scientific classification
- Kingdom: Animalia
- Phylum: Arthropoda
- Class: Insecta
- Order: Diptera
- Family: Tachinidae
- Subfamily: Dexiinae
- Tribe: Voriini
- Genus: Voria
- Species: V. aurifrons

Binomial name
- Voria aurifrons (Townsend, 1892)

Synonyms
- Plagia aurifrons Townsend, 1892

Species of fly

Voria aurifrons is a species of fly in the family Tachinidae.

== Distribution ==
Canada, United States
