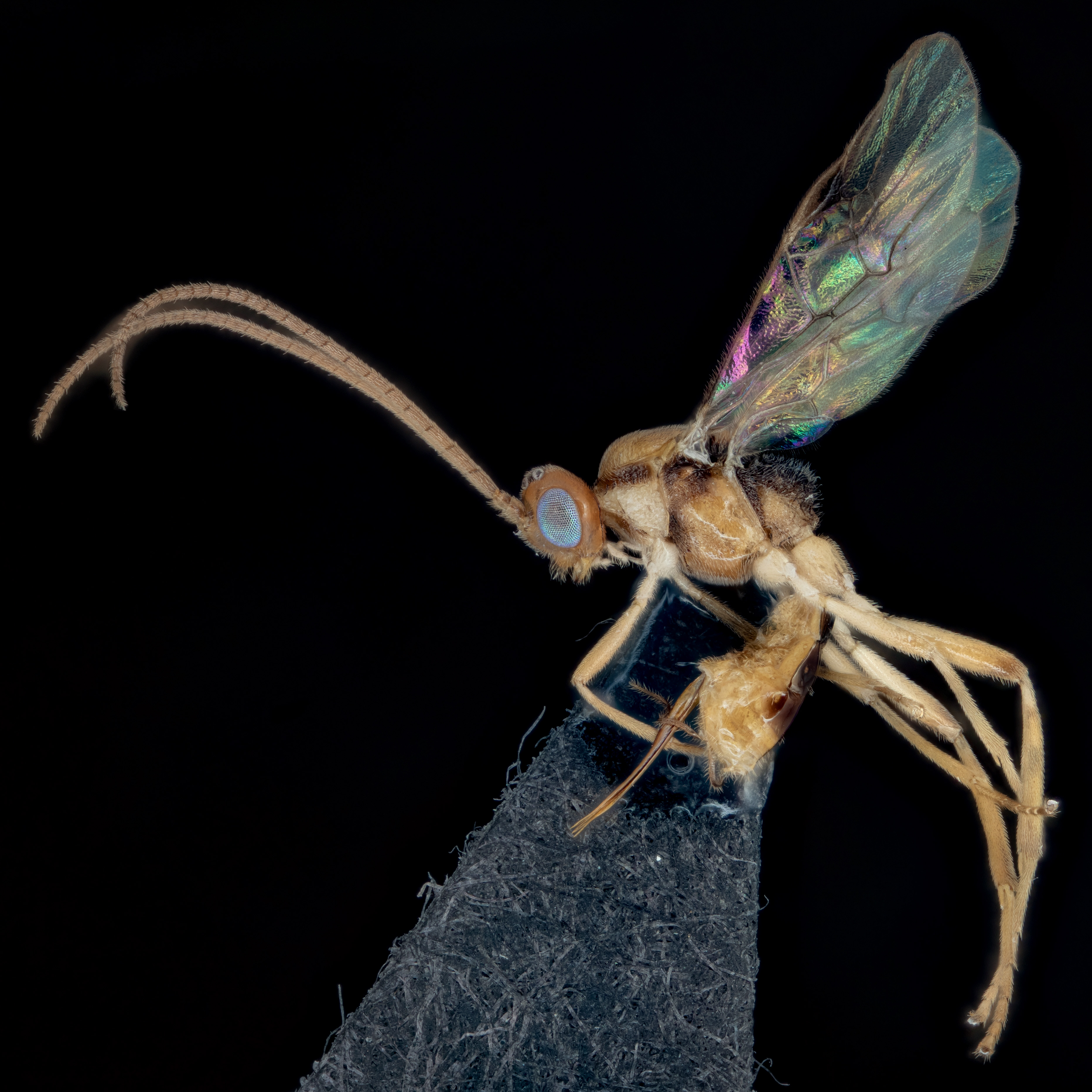

Scientific classification
- Kingdom: Animalia
- Phylum: Arthropoda
- Class: Insecta
- Order: Hymenoptera
- Family: Braconidae
- Genus: Meteorus
- Species: M. stellatus

Binomial name
- Meteorus stellatus Fujie et al., 2021

= Meteorus stellatus =

Species of parasitoid wasp

Meteorus stellatus is a species of parasitoid wasp, parasitising moths in the forests of the Okinawa-hontô and Amami-ôshima Islands, subtropical Japan.

== Larvae ==
The species was identified due to its unique cocoons which are star-shaped masses suspended by 1-meter threads. Meteorus stellatus only lays one of theses cocoons at once. These threads can grow up to 1 meter in length. The cocoons are around 7 to 14 mm wide and 9 to 23 mm long. Scientist of the study believe this unique structure helps M. stellatus survive through the most critical time when they are exposed to various natural enemies and environmental stresses. The star shape most likely reduces the exposed area of individual cocoons, thus increasing their defense against hyper-parasitoids, while the long thread that suspends the cocoon mass protects the cocoons from potential enemies like ants.

== Etymology ==
The specific epithet "stellatus" came from the Latin word for "star" presumably due to the star-shaped cocoon masses.
