= Syntretus =

Scientific classification
- Domain: Eukaryota
- Kingdom: Animalia
- Phylum: Arthropoda
- Class: Insecta
- Order: Hymenoptera
- Family: Braconidae
- Subfamily: Euphorinae
- Tribe: Syntretini
- Genus: Syntretus; Foerster, 1862

Species
- Several, including: Syntretus elegans; Syntretus falcifer; Syntretus fuscivalvis; Syntretus idalius; Syntretus perlmani; Syntretus splendidus; Syntretus taegeri; Syntretus trigonaphagus; Syntretus zuijleni

Synonyms
- Falcosyntretus Tobias, 1965; Parasyntretus Belokobylskij, 1993; Exosyntretrus Belokobylskij, 1998

Genus of wasps

Syntretus is a genus of parasitoid wasps. Most parasitize adult hymenopterans, though one species (Syntretus perlmani) parasitizes adult Drosophila fruit flies.
