= Syntretus elegans =

Scientific classification
- Kingdom: Animalia
- Phylum: Arthropoda
- Class: Insecta
- Order: Hymenoptera
- Family: Braconidae
- Genus: Syntretus
- Species: S. elegans

Binomial name
- Syntretus elegans (Ruthe, 1856)

Synonyms
- Microctonus elegans Ruthe, 1856

Species of wasp

Syntretus elegans is a species of parasitic wasps of adult bumblebees. It is found in Europe.
