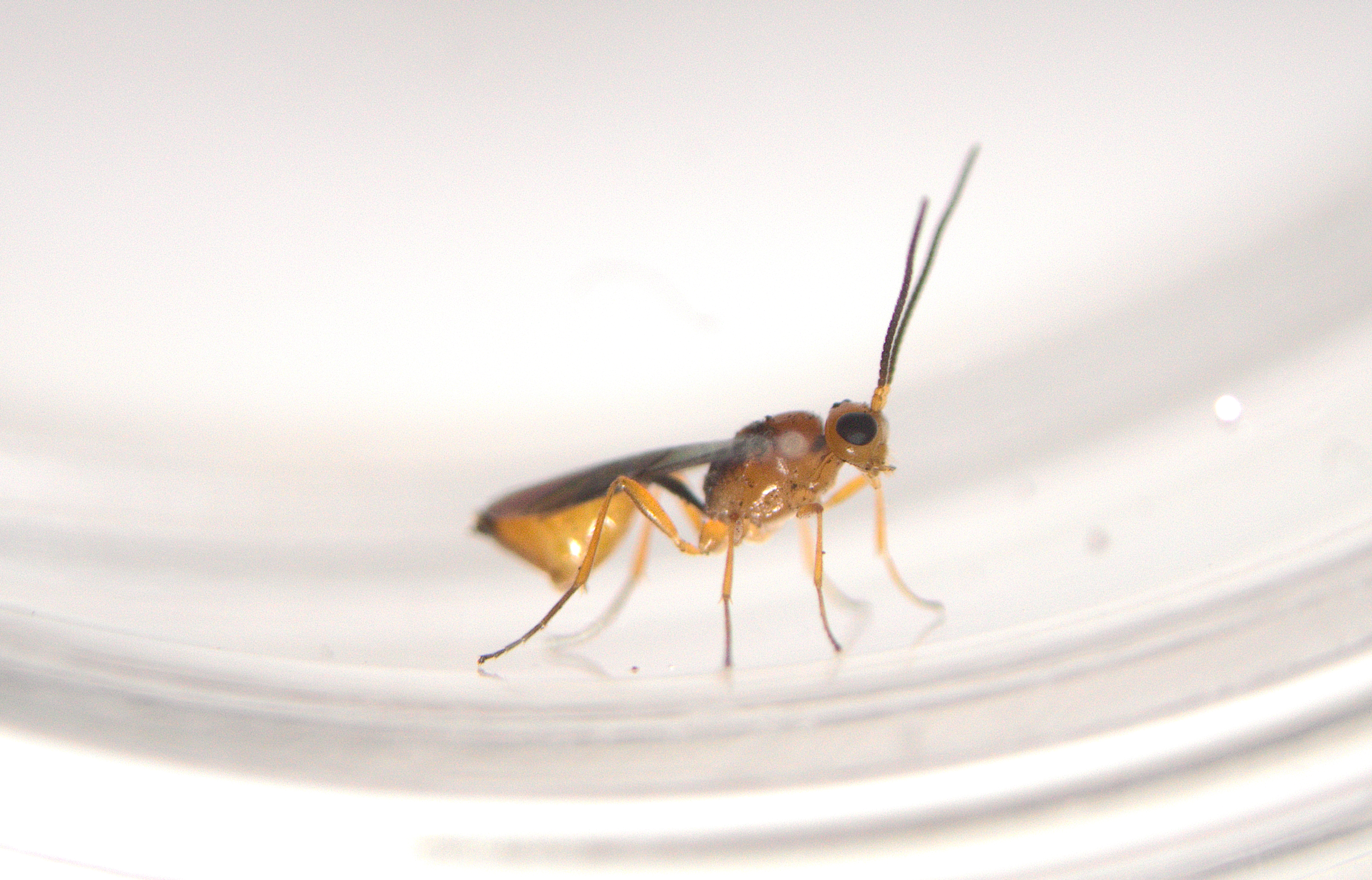
- Female

Scientific classification
- Kingdom: Animalia
- Phylum: Arthropoda
- Clade: Pancrustacea
- Class: Insecta
- Order: Hymenoptera
- Family: Braconidae
- Genus: Syntretus
- Species: S. trigonaphagus

Binomial name
- Syntretus trigonaphagus (Gloag, Shaw, & Burwell, 2009)

= Syntretus trigonaphagus =

Species of parasitic wasp

Syntretus trigonaphagus is a species of parasitoid wasps targeting the social bee Tetragonula carbonaria. It has been identified across the eastern coast of Australia.

== Biology ==
S. trigonaphagus is an endoparasite of adult foraging T. carbonaria bees. The wasp has been sighted targeting bees as they forage on flowers and resin deposits, as well as sitting at the entrances to their hives. As a parasitoid, it is only parasitic in its larval stage, and is a free-living wasp once mature.

To reproduce, the female wasp will deposit a single egg into the host bee’s abdomen. The egg then hatches, and the emerging larva grows inside the bee’s abdomen. Once the larva reaches its final instar and is ready to pupate, it will emerge from its host’s abdomen by breaking through the 4th and 5th metasomal tergites of the host. The larva then burrows into the soil to spin a cocoon, the host bee dying in the following hours..
