= Helicoverpa assulta =

Scientific classification
- Kingdom: Animalia
- Phylum: Arthropoda
- Class: Insecta
- Order: Lepidoptera
- Superfamily: Noctuoidea
- Family: Noctuidae
- Genus: Helicoverpa
- Species: H. assulta

Binomial name
- Helicoverpa assulta (Guenée, 1852)

Synonyms
- Chloridea assulta; Heliothis assulta Guenée, 1852; Helicoverpa separata Walker, 1857; Helicoverpa temperata Walker, 1857; Helicoverpa succinea Moore, 1881; Helicoverpa afra Hardwick, 1965

Species of moth

Helicoverpa assulta, the oriental tobacco budworm, is a moth of the family Noctuidae. H. assulta adults are migratory and are found all over the Old World Tropics including Asia, Africa, and Australia.

This species has a brown coloured pattern on their forewings while their hindwings are yellowish orange and have a brown margin which has a pale mark. The wingspan is about 25 millimetres (0.98 in). H. assulta is closely related to Helicoverpa armigera and Helicoverpa zea.

The larvae feed on various Solanaceae species, including Lycopersicon, Nicotiana (Nicotiana tabacum), Physalis and Solanum. It also feeds on fruits of Physalis peruviana and Datura species. Because of its feeding behavior, H. assulta is considered a pest of economically viable crops including tomatoes, tobacco, and hot peppers. Due to the pest status, understanding how to control the moth’s behavior is a priority, but the species’ larval eating behavior and growing resistance to insecticide complicate pest control.

== Geographic range ==
H. assulta is distributed across three continents: Asia, Africa and Australia. In Asia, populations of H. assulta are specifically found in China, Korea, Thailand, and Japan. Environmental conditions, like temperature and geographic locality, can impact the fecundity of the moth.

== Food resources ==
H. assulta is a pest of red peppers (Capsicum frutescens ), tobacco (Nicotiatna tabacum), tomato, and onion. They prefer to eat red peppers over tobacco, but are still considered a pest to both. In order to develop and survive successfully, the moth must both have access to nutrient rich food, and be able to digest and uptake the nutrients.

=== Capsaicin ===
H. assulta is one of very few insects that can successfully feed on and damage plants, such as hot peppers, containing capsaicin. Studies show that long-term dietary exposure to capsaicin stimulates larger larvae. Furthermore, its unique tolerance to capsaicin may have allowed H. assulta to expand its host range.

=== Life Stages ===
==== Larvae ====
Hatching larvae feed on tender or new leaves near the site of oviposition. When it goes through instar, larvae feed on the fruit and flowers of the host, and can infest the host over the course of their development. Newly hatched larvae exhibit a great preference for tender tobacco leaves, followed by pepper and tomato leaves. The success of H. assulta is significantly dependent on its larval diet. Larvae that fed on tobacco had a significantly greater fecundity than those that fed on red peppers. The sex ratio differs slightly depending on the type of food the larvae feed on. Larvae who feed on mainly tobacco have a higher female ratio compared to those which feed on mainly pepper. The H. assulta also preferred tomato as a host plant. The preference for bush red pepper, tobacco, and tomato may be correlated to the semiochemicals or allelochemicals of the host.

==== Adult ====
As an adult, the moth prefers to feed on tomatoes during oviposition, followed by tobacco and pepper. Larval diets also impact the number of eggs laid. Adults that previously fed as larvae upon red peppers laid significantly more eggs compared to those that fed on tobacco. Feeding on red peppers also yielded shorter generation time, heavier pupae and lower larval and pupal mortality compared to feeding on tobacco.

== Mating ==
Mating occurs during the early hours of the scotophase or the dark phase of a light-dark cycle. However, the mating peak in virgin females tends to advance with age. Unmated adults have also been observed to live longer than mated adults. Prior to mating, females protract and retract the terminal abdomen and vibrate the wings. Mating behavior of adult males includes antennal movement, wing elevation and vibration, extension of hairs, and tapping of the female ovipositor, leading to copulation. Studies also indicate that sex pheromone release is also mediated by PBAN. Female calling and sex pheromone release are also mediated by circadian rhythms entrained to light. This moth is highly sensitive to light intensity, which impacted their sexual behavior. Female calling is inhibited in high-intensity light (50.0 lux), and promoted in low-intensity light (0.5 lux).

=== Sex pheromones ===
Sex pheromones are secreted chemicals used to attract another member of the opposite sex. Because there are different subtypes of H. assulta, each population will respond differently to different ratios and blends of various sex pheromones. Using gas chromatography and mass spectrometry, researchers have identified two sub-populations that respond to different combinations of sex pheromones. There are nine compounds found from female ovipositor washings including hexadecanal, (Z)-9-hexadecenal, (Z)-11-hexadecenal, hexadecyl acetate, (Z)-9-hexadecenyl acetate, (Z)-11-hexadecenyl acetate, hexadecan-l-ol, (Z)-9-hexadecen-l-ol, and (Z)-11-hexadecen-1-ol. The main pheromones that are used are two types of hexadecenals, (Z)-hexadecenal and (Z)-11 hexadecenal, and (Z)-9-hexadecenyl acetate. Field studies conducted in Korea, China, and Thailand also illustrated that a blend of (Z)-9-hexadecenal and (Z)-11-hexadecenal was sufficient for attraction, however the most attractive ratio of compounds varied by specific location. Researchers found that Korean moths preferred a 20:1 blend of (Z)-9-hexadecenal to (Z)-11-hexadecenal. In Thailand, a 7:5:1 blend was most attractive to moths. And in China, the moths found the two different blends equally attractive.

=== Release of Pheromones ===
The suboesophageal ganglion, a portion of the central nervous system in the insect, controls pheromone release. A phermonotropic factor called PBAN (pheromone biosynthesis activating neuropeptide) is synthesized and released into the hemolymph or blood-like fluid found in insects. Because PBAN can be produced independently of the moth's photoperiod, the circadian rhythm of pheromone production must be closely associated with PBAN release. Sex pheromones are only released during scotophase and immediately after pheromone synthesis. Maximum pheromone titer is from day one to day five, and then decreases.

The highest concentration of the major female sex pheromone, (Z)-9 hexadecenal (Z9-Z16:Al), is released in a distinct pattern over a 24-hour period or a circadian periodicity. This pattern is affected by age, photoperiod, and temperature. The daily rhythm of hormone production varies when the female moths are reared under 12 hours of light and 12 hours of darkness vs. continuous light conditions. The maximum pheromone titers in the gland corresponded to the peak calling activities, indicating that these events are synchronous and predictable. In constant darkness, these events were also synchronous. However, when placed in constant light, the H. assulta has two different patterns for pheromone release and calling behavior. Calling was suppressed, but the pheromone release was not. This suggests that these two behaviors are controlled by two different systems, and can somehow communicate to synchronize under normal conditions.

When moths are placed in constant light, there is a longer retention and slower decrease of Z9-16: AL in the pheromone gland. The moths may continue to produce the pheromone for a longer period of time, or that the degradation mechanism is inactive and the chemical may only decrease through release. The production of Z9-16: AL is highest under darkness and low-intensity light (0.5 lux), and inhibited at higher-intensity light (5.0 and 50.0 lux).

== Pest control ==
H. assulta is considered to be one of the most destructive pests for various economic crops like tobacco and hot peppers. The moth has caused considerable economic damage to crops in Korea and China. The larvae usually feed on the fruit of host plants. Unlike other insects, it has a high tolerance for the toxicity of capsaicin. While conventional chemical insecticides are necessary for the control of these moths, the growing resistance of the moth and the detrimental effects of overusing these chemicals have drawn researchers to develop other methods of control. Furthermore, the larvae feed inside the fruit, and are therefore protected from the chemical sprays. Studies have illustrated that the moth’s response to insecticide depends on the type of plant it's inhabiting. H. assulta that were fed on red peppers were more susceptible to certain insecticides such as fenvalerate, but became more resistant to chemicals like inoxacarb, phoxim and methomyl. Current research explores sex pheromone-mediated communication, a method of control aiming to interrupt moth communication. Also, there is a need to understand the complex interactions among the insect, plant, and insecticide.
