= Syntretus perlmani =

Scientific classification (provisionally accepted)
- Kingdom: Animalia
- Phylum: Arthropoda
- Clade: Pancrustacea
- Class: Insecta
- Order: Hymenoptera
- Family: Braconidae
- Genus: Syntretus
- Species: S. perlmani

Binomial name
- Syntretus perlmani Moore, Chris Amuwa, Shaw & Ballinger, 2024

Species of parasitic wasp

Syntretus perlmani is a species of parasitic wasps of adult Drosophila. It is currently the only known parasitoid wasp that targets adult flies, as opposed to their larval or pupal stages. It has been identified across the eastern USA.

S. perlmani is an endoparasite. Female wasps lay a single egg in the abdomen of adult flies. Post oviposition, the larval stage of the wasp lasts around 18 days, with infection of the fly visible with the naked eye (i.e. without dissection) after 7 days. When fully developed, the larva will emerge from the host abdomen by chewing through the host cuticle and then burrowing into soil to pupate. The wasp will construct a cocoon around itself to pupate within. The pupal stage of the wasp lasts around 23 days.
