= Chrysopophthorus hungaricus =

Scientific classification
- Kingdom: Animalia
- Phylum: Arthropoda
- Class: Insecta
- Order: Hymenoptera
- Family: Braconidae
- Genus: Chrysopophthorus
- Species: C. hungaricus

Binomial name
- Chrysopophthorus hungaricus (Kiss, 1927)

Synonyms
- Chrysopophthorus chrysopimaginis Goidanich, 1948; Chrysopophthorus elegans Tobias, 1961; Chrysopophtorus chrysopimaginis Goidanich, 1948; Helimorpha hungaricus Zilahi-Kiss, 1927

Species of wasp

Chrysopophthorus hungaricus is a species of hymenopteran in the family Braconidae, found in Europe.

This species is a parasitoid of adult Chrysopidae (Neuroptera).
