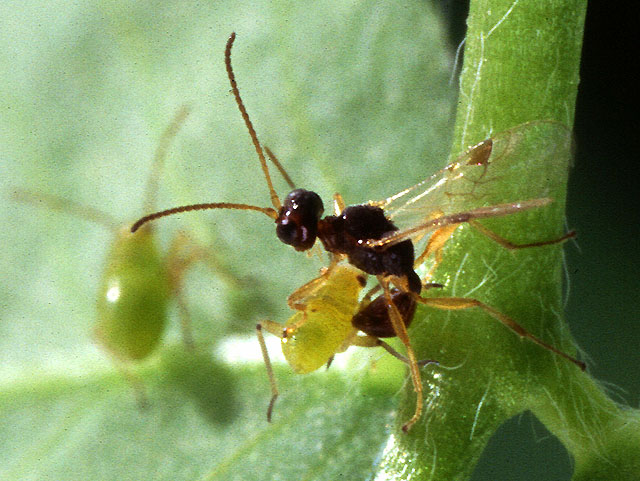
- Peristenus digoneutis

Scientific classification
- Kingdom: Animalia
- Phylum: Arthropoda
- Clade: Pancrustacea
- Class: Insecta
- Order: Hymenoptera
- Family: Braconidae
- Subfamily: Euphorinae; Förster, 1862

Tribes
- Several, see text

= Euphorinae =

Subfamily of wasps

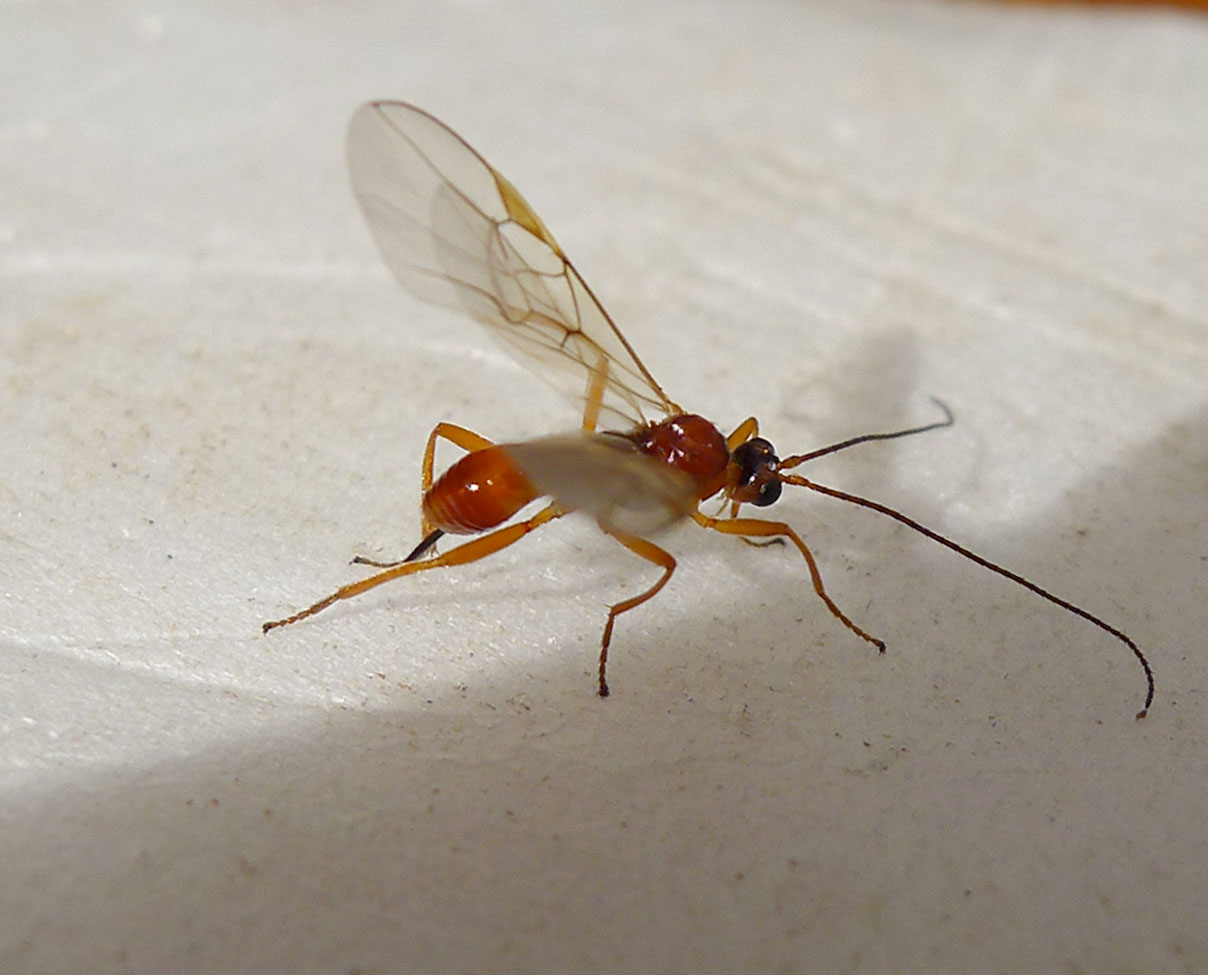
Pygostolus

The Euphorinae are a large subfamily of Braconidae parasitoid wasps. Some species have been used for biological pest control. They are sister group to the Meteorinae.

There are over 1270 species of Euphorinae.

== Description and distribution ==
Euphorines are small, usually dark colored wasps. They are non-cyclostomes. Euphorines are found worldwide.

== Biology ==
Euphorines are solitary or rarely gregarious koinobiont endoparasitoids. Unlike most other parasitoid wasps, Euphorinae have a broad host range and attack adult insects or nymphs of hemimetabolous insects.

Wasps of the tribe Dinocampini parasitize adult beetles.

== Taxonomy and phylogeny ==
Shaw (1985) divided Euphorinae into three tribes, Cosmophorini and Meteorini with one genus each and Euphorini containing 33 genera. In 1997, Shaw proposed 9 tribes and 31 genera of Euphorinae. By Yu et al. (2012), the list of representative tribes of Euphorinae had grown to 16: Centistini, Cosmophorini, Cryptoxilonini, Dinocampini, Euphorini, Helorimorphini, Mannokeraiini, Meteorini, Myiocephalini, Neoneurini, †Oncometeorini, Perilitini, Planitorini, Proclithrophorini, Syntretini, and Tainitermini. Mannokeraiini was synonymised under Planitorini by van Achterberg et al. (2017). Stigenberg et al. (2015) treated 52 genera in 14 extant tribes, elevating Pygostolini from a subtribe of Centistini, synonymizing Cryptoxilonini under Cormophorini, synonymizing Proclithrophorini under Townesilitini, and removing Tainitermini as not nested within Euphorinae. Chen & van Achterberg (2019) included the additional tribe of Eadyini and removed Proclithrophorini from synonymy. In 2021, Stigenberg & van Achterberg returned Proclithrophorini to synonymy under Townesilitini. Bendixen & Shaw (2024) elevated the Meteorini again to subfamily status as Meteorinae rather than treat them as basal Euphorinae.

The present Euphorinae thus contains 14 extant tribes: Centistini, Cosmophorini, Dinocampini, Eadyini, Ecnomiini, Euphorini, Helorimorphini, Myiocephalini, Neoneurini, Perilitini, Planitorini, Pygostolini, Syntretini, and Townesilitini.

Belokobylskij (2022) recognize two extinct tribes, Oncometeorini and Prosyntretini.

== Genera ==
The following 56 extant genera and 6 extinct genera belong to the subfamily Euphorinae:

- Stenope van Achterberg & Reshchikov, 2018

=== Tribe Centistini Čapek, 1970 ===
- Allurus Förster, 1862
- Asiacentistes Belokobylskij, 1995
- Centistes Haliday, 1835
- Centistoides van Achterberg, 1992
- †Parasyrrhizus Brues, 1933

=== Tribe Cosmophorini Čapek, 1958 ===
- Cosmophorus Ratzeburg, 1848
- Cryptoxilos Viereck, 1911
- Plynops Shaw, 1996
- Ropalophorus Curtis, 1837
- Sinuatophorus van Achterberg, 2000
- Tuberidelus Chen & van Achterberg, 1997

=== Tribe Dinocampini Shaw, 1985 ===
- Betelgeuse Shaw, 1988
- Centistina Enderlein, 1912
- Dinocampus Förster, 1862
- Ecclitura Kokujev, 1902
- Yanayacu Zhang & Chen, 2015

=== Tribe Eadyini van Achterberg, 2000 ===
- Eadya Huddleston & Short, 1978

=== Tribe Ecnomiini van Achterberg, 1985 ===
- Ecnomios Mason, 1979
- Korecnomios Park & van Achterberg, 1994

=== Tribe Euphorini Shaw, 1985 ===
- Leiophron Nees von Esenbeck, 1818
- Mama Belokobylskij, 2000
- Peristenus Förster, 1862

=== Tribe Helorimorphini Schmiedeknecht, 1907 ===
- Aridelus Marshall, 1887
- Chrysopophthorus Goidanich, 1948
- Holdawayella Loan 1967
- Wesmaelia Förster, 1862

=== Tribe Myiocephalini Chen & van Achterberg, 1997 ===
- Myiocephalus Marshall, 1897

=== Tribe Neoneurini Bengtsson, 1918 ===
- Elasmosoma Ruthe, 1858
- †Elasmosomites Brues, 1933
- Euneoneurus Tobias & Yuldashev, 1979
- Kollasmosoma van Achterberg & Argaman, 1993
- Neoneurus Haliday, 1838
- Parelasmosoma Tobias & Yuldashev, 1979

=== †Tribe Oncometeorini Tobias, 1987 ===
- †Oncometeorus Tobias, 1987

=== Tribe Perilitini Förster, 1862 ===
- †Meteorites Brues, 1939
- Microctonus Wesmael, 1835
- Notioperilitus Belokobylskij, 2018
- †Onychoura Brues, 1933
- Orionis Shaw, 1987
- Perilitus Nees, 1818
- Rilipertus Haeselbarth, 1996
- Spathicopis van Achterberg, 1977
- Stenothremma Shaw, 1984

=== Tribe Planitorini van Achterberg, 1995 ===
- Mannokeraia van Achterberg, 1995
- Paramannokeraia van Achterberg & Quicke, 2017
- Planitorus van Achterberg, 1995

=== †Tribe Prosyntretini Tobias, 1987 ===
- †Prosyntretus Tobias, 1987

=== Tribe Pygostolini Belokobylskij, 2000 ===
- Litostolus van Achterberg, 1985
- Pygostolus Haliday, 1833

=== Tribe Syntretini Shaw, 1985 ===
- Bracteodes De Saeger, 1946
- Sculptosyntretus Belokobylskij, 1993
- Syntretellus De Saeger, 1946
- Syntretomorpha Papp, 1962
- Syntretoriana Parrott, 1953
- Syntretus Förster, 1862

=== Tribe Townesilitini Shaw, 1985 ===
- Gretiella Stigenberg, 2021
- Heia Chen & van Achterberg, 1997
- Marshiella Shaw, 1985
- Proclithrophorus Tobias & Belokobylskij, 1981
- Streblocera Westwood, 1833
- Townesilitus Haeselbarth & Loan, 1983
