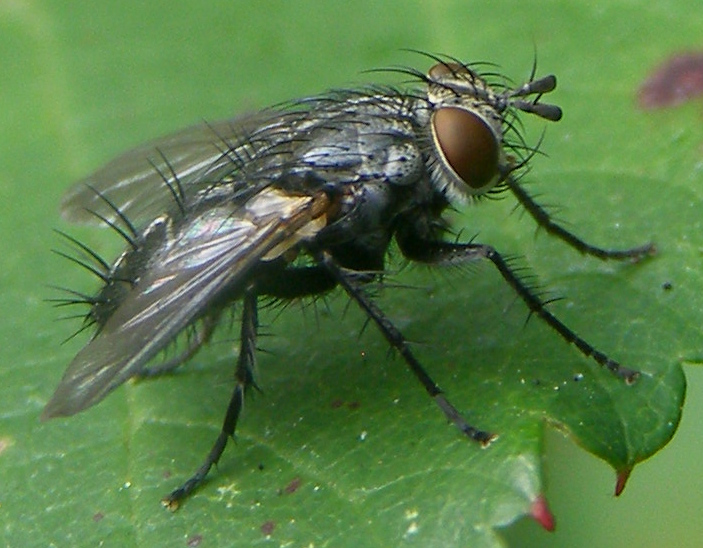

Scientific classification
- Kingdom: Animalia
- Phylum: Arthropoda
- Clade: Pancrustacea
- Class: Insecta
- Order: Diptera
- Family: Tachinidae
- Subfamily: Dexiinae
- Tribe: Voriini
- Genus: Voria
- Species: V. ruralis

Binomial name
- Voria ruralis (Fallén, 1810)

Synonyms
- Plagia americana Wulp, 1890; Plagia mexicana Giglio-Tos, 1893; Plagia transversa Macquart, 1848; Tachina ambigua Fallén, 1810; Tachina arcuata Macquart, 1834; Tachina interrupta Zetterstedt, 1844; Tachina ruralis Fallén, 1810; Tachina spinicosta Palm, 1875; Tachina verticialis Meigen, 1824; Voria americana Wulp, 1890; Voria ayerzai Blanchard, 1943; Voria brasiliana Townsend, 1929; Voria ciliata Aguilar, 1957; Voria edentata Baranov, 1932; Voria latifrons Robineau-Desvoidy, 1830

= Voria ruralis =

Species of fly

Voria ruralis is a species of fly in the family Tachinidae.

== Distribution ==
Canada, United States, Puerto Rico, Trinidad and Tobago, Mexico, Nicaragua, Argentina, Brazil, Chile, Colombia, Peru, Uruguay, Venezuela, China, British Isles, Belarus, Czech Republic, Estonia, Hungary, Latvia, Lithuania, Moldova, Poland, Romania, Slovakia, Ukraine, Denmark, Finland, Norway, Sweden, Albania, Andorra, Bosnia & Herzegovina, Bulgaria, Croatia, Greece, Italy, North Macedonia, Portugal, Serbia, Slovenia, Spain, Turkey, Austria, Belgium, Channel Islands, France, Germany, Netherlands, Switzerland, Japan, South Korea, Iran, Israel, Palestine, Mongolia, Russia, Transcaucasia, Kenya, South Africa, Yemen, India, Nepal, Pakistan, Taiwan, Australia, Papua New Guinea.
