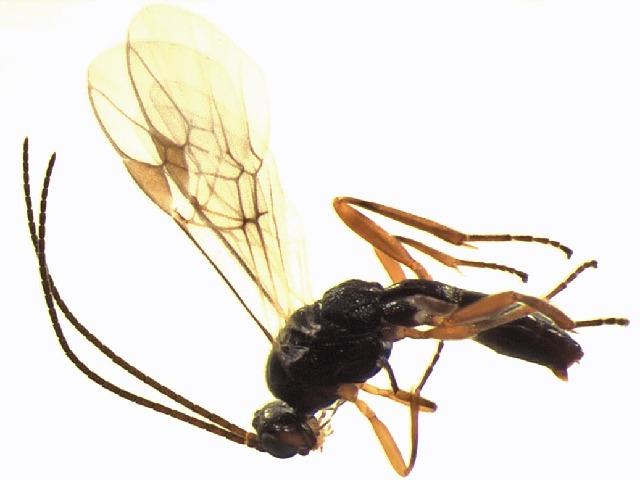

Scientific classification
- Domain: Eukaryota
- Kingdom: Animalia
- Phylum: Arthropoda
- Class: Insecta
- Order: Hymenoptera
- Family: Braconidae
- Genus: Meteorus
- Species: M. rubens

Binomial name
- Meteorus rubens (Nees, 1811)

Synonyms
- Meteorus leviventris (Wesmael, 1835)

= Meteorus rubens =

Species of wasp

Meteorus rubens is a species of parasitoid wasp in the family Braconidae which attacks significant crop pests including the black cutworm, Agrotis ipsilon. The wasps have been shown to be easily collected through the use of traps baited with mustard oils. They have been shown to carry Rioviridae RNA viruses, one of only a few parasitoids to carry them.
