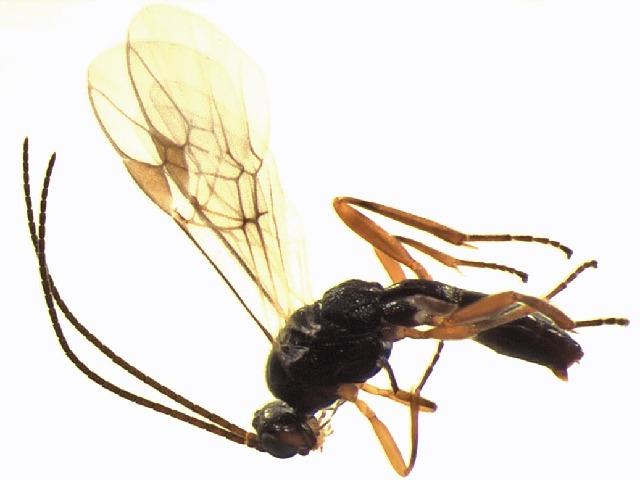
- Meteorus rubens

Scientific classification
- Domain: Eukaryota
- Kingdom: Animalia
- Phylum: Arthropoda
- Class: Insecta
- Order: Hymenoptera
- Family: Braconidae
- Subfamily: Euphorinae
- Genus: Meteorus; Haliday, 1835

= Meteorus =

Genus of wasps

Meteorus is a genus of parasitoid wasps in the family Braconidae. It comprises over 330 species worldwide.

Meteorus wasps are distinguished from other braconid wasps by the presence of a second submarginal cell in the forewing and a petiolate first tergite.

== Selected species ==
- Meteorus andreae Aguirrer & Shaw, 2011
- Meteorus gyrator Thunberg, 1922
- Meteorus hyphantriae Riley, 1887
- Meteorus laphygmae Viereck 1913
- Meteorus pulchricornis Wesmael, 1835
- Meteorus rubens Nees, 1811
- Meteorus stellatus Fujie et al., 2021
- Meteorus trachynotus Viereck, 1912
