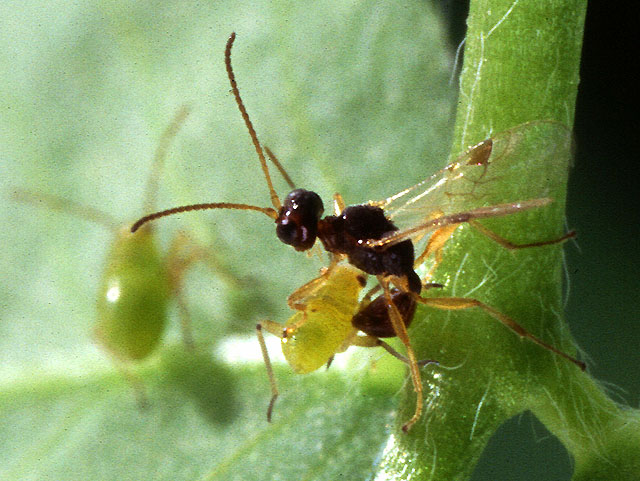
- Peristenus digoneutis prepares to lay an egg in a tarnished plant bug nymph

Scientific classification
- Kingdom: Animalia
- Phylum: Arthropoda
- Class: Insecta
- Order: Hymenoptera
- Family: Braconidae
- Subfamily: Euphorinae
- Genus: Peristenus; Foerster, 1862

= Peristenus =

Genus of wasps

Peristenus is a genus of hymenopteran parasitoid belonging to the family Braconidae.

== Species ==
- Peristenus accinctus (Haliday, 1835)
- Peristenus adelphocorides Loan, 1979
- Peristenus angifemoralis van Achterberg & Guerrero, 2003
- Peristenus brevicornis (Herrich-Schäffer, 1838)
- Peristenus dayi Goulet, 2006
- Peristenus digoneutis Loan, 1973
- Peristenus facialis (Thomson, 1892)
- Peristenus gloriae van Achterberg & Guerrero, 2003
- Peristenus grandiceps (Thomson, 1892)
- Peristenus howardi Shaw, 1999
- Peristenus kazak (Tobias, 1986)
- Peristenus kokujevi (Tobias, 1986)
- Peristenus maderae (Graham, 1986)
- Peristenus malatus Loan, 1976
- Peristenus mellipes (Cresson, 1872)
- Peristenus microcerus (Thomson, 1892)
- Peristenus nitidus (Curtis, 1833)
- Peristenus obscuripes (Thomson, 1892)
- Peristenus orchesiae (Curtis, 1833)
- Peristenus pallipes (Curtis, 1833)
- Peristenus picipes (Curtis, 1833)
- Peristenus pseudopallipes (Loan, 1970)
- Peristenus relictus (Ruthe, 1856)
- Peristenus rubricollis (Thomson, 1892)
- Peristenus trjapitzini (Tobias, 1986)
- Peristenus varisae van Achterberg, 2001
