= Elasmosoma =

Scientific classification
- Domain: Eukaryota
- Kingdom: Animalia
- Phylum: Arthropoda
- Class: Insecta
- Order: Hymenoptera
- Family: Braconidae
- Genus: Elasmosoma; Ruthe, 1858

Genus of wasps

Elasmosoma is a genus of insects belonging to the family Braconidae.

The species of this genus are found in the Northern Hemisphere.

== Selected species ==
- Elasmosoma bakeri Ashmead, 1895
- Elasmosoma berolinense Ruthe, 1858
- Elasmosoma calcaratum Tobias, 1986
- Elasmosoma depressum van Achterberg & Koponen, 2003
- Elasmosoma luxemburgense Wasmann, 1909
- Elasmosoma michaeli Shaw, 2007
- Elasmosoma obscuripennis (He, Chen & van Achterberg, 1997)
- Elasmosoma pallidipennis (He, Chen & van Achterberg, 1997)
- Elasmosoma pergandei Ashmead, 1895
- Elasmosoma petulans Muesebeck 1941
- Elasmosoma schwarzi Ashmead, 1895
- Elasmosoma taiwanense Chou, 1985
- Elasmosoma trichopygidium Belokobylskij, 2000
- Elasmosoma vigilans Cockerell, 1909
