= Pheromone biosynthesis activating neuropeptide =

Neurohormone that activates the biosynthesis of pheromones in moths

The pheromone biosynthesis activation neuropeptide (PBAN) is a neurohormone (member of the PBAN/pyrokinin neuropeptide family) that activates the biosynthesis of pheromones in moths. Female moths release PBAN into their hemolymph during the scotophase to stimulate the biosynthesis of the unique pheromone that will attract the conspecific males. PBAN release is drastically reduced after mating, contributing to the loss in female receptivity. In black cutworm (Agrotis ipsilon), it has been shown that the juvenile hormone helps induce release of PBAN which goes on to influence pheromone production and responsiveness in females and males, respectively. In the oriental tobacco budworm (Helicoverpa assulta), the circadian rhythm of pheromone production is closely associated with PBAN release.

== Molecular mechanism of action ==
The precise regulatory mechanisms exerted by PBAN on the different steps of pheromone biosynthesis remain to be determined. However, the receptor of this neuropeptide has been already cloned. The receptor belongs to the G-protein coupled receptors, and its activation leads to an increase of intracellular calcium levels. According to the effects of gene disruption in the pheromone synthesis of bombykol, the main pheromone component of the silk moth (Bombyx mori) and the corn earworm moth (Helicoverpa zea), the increase in intracellular calcium levels turns to activate different key enzymes of the last steps of pheromone biosynthesis.
