= List of moths of Chile (Noctuidae) =

This is a list of the moths of family Noctuidae (sensu Kitching & Rawlins, 1999) which are found in Chile. It also acts as an index to the species articles and forms part of the full List of moths of Chile. Subfamilies are listed alphabetically.

== Subfamily Acronictinae ==
- Spodoptera albula (Walker, 1857)
- Spodoptera eridania (Cramer, 1782)
- Spodoptera frugiperda (Smith, 1797)
- Spodoptera mauritia (Boisduval, 1833)
- Spodoptera ochrea (Hampson, 1909)

== Subfamily Amphipyrinae ==
- Athetis nigrifrons (Dognin, 1919)
- Crimona nana Angulo y Olivares, 1999
- Elaphria bucephalina (Mabille, 1885)

== Subfamily Catocalinae ==
- Achaea janata (Linnaeus, 1758)
- Anticarsia gemmatalis Huebner, 1816
- Ascalapha odorata (Linnaeus, 1758)
- Euclidia runica Felder, 1874/Caenurgia runica Felder
- Euclidia vittata Phillipi
- Melipotis cellaris (Guenée, 1836)
- Melipotis paracellaris Angulo, 1984
- Melipotis trujillensis Dognin, 1905
- Melipotis walkeri (Butler, 1875)
- Mocis disseverans (Walker, 1858)
- Mocis latipes (Guenée, 1852)
- Mocis megas (Guenée, 1852)
- Ophideres apta (Walker, 1858)
- Zale lunata (Drury, 1770)

== Subfamily Cuculliinae ==
- Albirenia araucanica (Hampson, 1909)
- Albirenia minense Angulo y Olivares, 1999
- Albirenia transversalis Rodriguez y Olivares, 2000
- Andesia lesa (Koehler, 1979)
- Copitarsia anatunca Angulo y Olivares, 1999
- Copitarsia anguloi Castillo, 1991
- Copitarsia basilinea Koehler, 1958
- Copitarsia clavata (Koehler, 1952)
- Copitarsia humilis (Blanchard, 1852)
- Copitarsia murina Angulo, Olivares y Badilla, 2001
- Copitarsia naenoides (Butler, 1882)
- Copitarsia paraturbata Castillo & Angulo, 1991
- Copitarsia patagonica Hampson, 1906
- Copitarsia turbata (Herrich-Schäffer, 1855)
- Pseudocerura thoracica Butler, 1882
- Tenera andina (Koehler, 1979)
- Tenera purpuracea (Angulo & Olivares, 2000)

== Subfamily Hadeninae ==
- Chabuata carneago (Guerin, 1852)
- Dargida confundibilis (Koehler, 1989)
- Dargida permira (Draudt, 1924)
- Dargida tetragona (Mabille, 1885)
- Eriopyga perfusca Hampson, 1905
- Helicocervix ommatoblonga Angulo y Olivares, 1999
- Helicocervix penai Angulo y Olivares, 1999
- Leucania impuncta Guenée, 1852
- Mythimna loreyi (Duponchel, 1827)
- Pehuenquenia minuta Angulo y Olivares, 1999
- Pseudaletia punctulata (Blanchard, 1852)
- Scriptania badillai Rodríguez, 1999
- Scriptania chuzmiza Angulo y Olivares, 1999
- Scriptania cinerea Rodríguez y Angulo, 2001
- Scriptania cuculloides Angulo y Olivares, 1999
- Scriptania fallax Rodríguez, 1999
- Scriptania fasciata Angulo y Olivares, 1999
- Scriptania godoyi Olivares, 1993
- Scriptania inexpectata Rodríguez, 1998
- Scriptania leucofasciata Rodríguez, 1999
- Scriptania marcelae Angulo y Olivares, 1999
- Scriptania maulina Rodríguez & Angulo, 2001
- Scriptania paragodoyi Rodríguez & Olivares, 2001
- Scriptania plumbica (Koehler, 1959)
- Scriptania rubroides Rodríguez & Angulo, 2001
- Scriptania viridipennis Rodríguez & Angulo, 2001
- Scriptania yajminense Rodríguez & Olivares, 2001
- Strigania albilinea (Huebner, 1821)

== Subfamily Heliothinae ==
- Heliothis atacamae (Hardwick, 1965)
- Heliothis gelotopoeon (Dyar, 1921)
- Heliothis virescens (Fabricius, 1777)
- Heliothis zea (Boddie, 1850)
- Schinia chilensis (Hampson, 1903)
- Schinia gabrielae Badilla & Angulo, 1998

== Subfamily Noctuinae ==
- Agrotis araucaria (Hampson, 1903)
- Agrotis andina (Köhler, 1945)
- Agrotis bilitura Guenée, 1852
- Agrotis coquimbensis (Hampson, 1903)
- Agrotis dissociata Staudinger, 1899
- Agrotis edmondsi Butler, 1882
- Agrotis experta (Walker, 1869)
- Agrotis hispidula Guenée, 1852
- Agrotis ipsilon (Hufnagel, 1766)
- Agrotis malefida Guenée, 1852
- Agrotis subterranea (Fabricius, 1794)
- Atlantagrotis nelida (Köhler, 1945)
- Atlantagrotis aethes (Mabille, 1885)
- Beriotisia copahuensis (Köhler, 1967)
- Beriotisia cuculliformis (Köhler, 1945)
- Beriotisia fueguensis (Hampson, 1907)
- Beriotisia taniae Angulo & Olivares, 1999
- Beriotisia typhlina (Mabille, 1885)
- Blepharoa mamestrina (Butler, 1882)
- Boursinidia atrimedia (Hampson, 1907)
- Boursinidia darwini (Staudinger, 1899)
- Euxoamorpha ceciliae Angulo & Rodríguez, 1998
- Euxoamorpha eschata Franclemont, 1950
- Euxoamorpha ingoufii (Mabille, 1885)
- Euxoamorpha mendosica (Hampson, 1903)
- Euxoamorpha molibdoida (Staudinger, 1899)
- Janaesia antarctica (Staudinger, 1899)
- Janaesia carnea (Druce, 1903)
- Janaesia exclusiva Angulo & Olivares, 1999
- Janaesia hibernans (Köhler, 1968)
- Magnagrotis oorti (Köhler, 1945)
- Noctubourgognea bicolor (Mabille, 1885)
- Noctubourgognea coppingeri (Butler, 1881)
- Noctubourgognea glottuloides (Butler, 1882)
- Pareuxoa flavicosta (Wallengren, 1860)
- Pareuxoa fuscata Angulo & Olivares, 1999
- Pareuxoa gravida (Mabille, 1885)
- Pareuxoa janae Angulo, 1990
- Pareuxoa koehleri Olivares, 1992
- Pareuxoa lineifera (Blanchard, 1852)
- Pareuxoa luteicosta Angulo & Olivares, 1999
- Pareuxoa meditata Köhler, 1967
- Pareuxoa nigrolineata (Jana-Sáenz, 1989)
- Pareuxoa parajanae Olivares, 1992
- Pareuxoa perdita (Staudinger, 1889)
- Pareuxoa sanctisebastiani Köhler, 1954
- Peridroma ambrosioides (Walker, 1857)
- Peridroma chilenaria Angulo & Jana-Sáenz, 1984
- Peridroma clerica (Butler, 1882)
- Peridroma saucia (Hübner, [1808])
- Phaenagrotis hecateia Köhler, 1953
- Pseudoleucania brosii (Köhler, 1959)
- Pseudoleucania diana (Butler, 1882)
- Pseudoleucania ferruginescens (Blanchard, 1852)
- Pseudoleucania leucaniiformis (Zerny, 1916)
- Pseudoleucania luteomaculata Angulo & Olivares, 2001
- Pseudoleucania marii Köhler, 1979
- Pseudoleucania onerosa (Köhler, 1959)
- Scania anelluspinata Olivares, 1994
- Scania aspersa (Butler, 1882)
- Scania messia (Guenée, 1852)
- Scania neuquensis (Köhler, 1959)
- Scania odontoclasper Olivares, 1994
- Scania perlucida (Köhler, 1967)
- Scania perornata (Köhler, 1959)
- Scania simillima (Köhler, 1959)
- Scania strigigrapha (Hampson, 1905)
- Scania tephra (Köhler, 1945)
- Tisagronia pexa (Berg, 1877)

== Subfamily Plusiinae ==
- Argyrogramma basigera (Walker, 1865)
- Autographa biloba (Stephens)
- Autographa bonaerensis (Berg)
- Autoplusia egena (Guenée, 1852)
- Ctenoplusia albostriata (Bremer & Grey)
- Chrysodeixis chalcites (Esper)
- Pseudoplusia includens Walker
- Rachiplusia nu (Guenée)
- Rachiplusia virgula (Blanchard)
- Syngrapha gammoides (Blanchard)
- Trichoplusia ni (Hübner)
- Trichoplusia oxygramma (Geyer, 1832)

== Subfamily Ophiderinae ==
- Ascalapha odorata (Linnaeus, 1758)
- Anticarsia gemmatalis Hübner, 1818
- Gonodonta pyrgo (Cramer, [1777])
- Letis scops Guenée
- Melipotis cellaris (Guenée, 1852)
- Melipotis paracellaris Angulo
- Melipotis trujillensis Dognin
- Melipotis walkeri (Butler)
- Ophideres apta (Walker, [1858])
