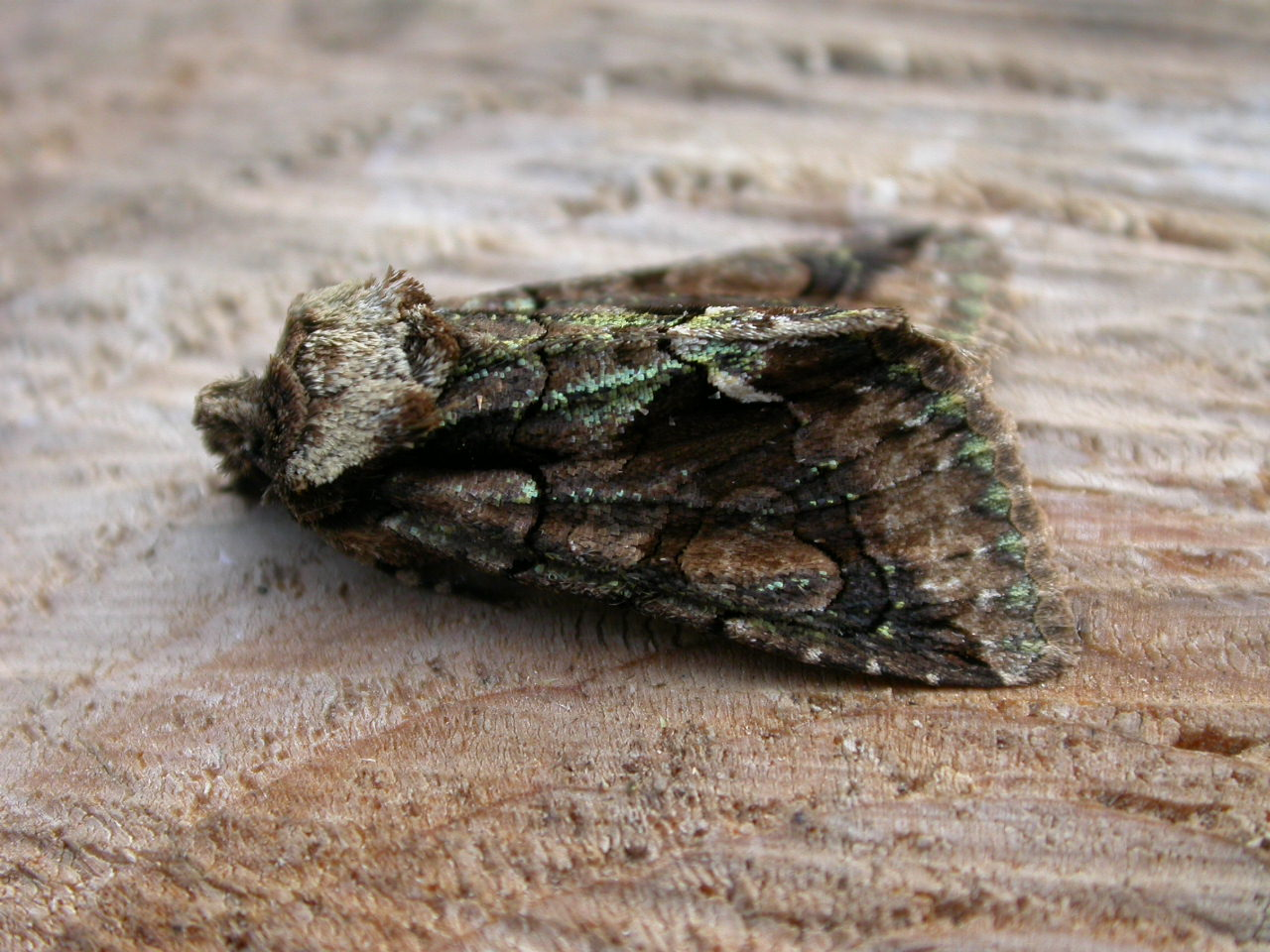
- Allophyes oxyacanthae

Scientific classification
- Domain: Eukaryota
- Kingdom: Animalia
- Phylum: Arthropoda
- Class: Insecta
- Order: Lepidoptera
- Superfamily: Noctuoidea
- Family: Noctuidae
- Subfamily: Cuculliinae
- Genus: Allophyes; Tams, 1942

= Allophyes =

Genus of moths

Allophyes is a genus of moths of the family Noctuidae. The genus was described by Tams in 1942.

== Species ==
- Allophyes albithorax (Draudt, 1950)
- Allophyes alfaroi Agenjo, 1951
- Allophyes asiatica (Staudinger, 1892)
- Allophyes benedictina (Staudinger, 1892)
- Allophyes corsica (Spuler, 1905)
- Allophyes cretica Pinker & Reisser, 1978
- Allophyes heliocausta Boursin, 1957
- Allophyes metaxys Boursin, 1953
- Allophyes miaoli Hreblay & Kobayashi, 1997
- Allophyes oxyacanthae (Linnaeus, 1758) – green-brindled crescent
- Allophyes powelli Rungs, 1952
- Allophyes renalis (Wiltshire, 1941)
- Allophyes sericina Ronkay, Varga & Hreblay, 1998
- Allophyes yuennana Hreblay & Ronkay, 1997
