= Geshna =

Scientific classification
- Kingdom: Animalia
- Phylum: Arthropoda
- Class: Insecta
- Order: Lepidoptera
- Family: Crambidae
- Subfamily: Spilomelinae
- Genus: Geshna; Dyar, 1906
- Species: G. cannalis

Binomial name
- Geshna cannalis (Quaintance, 1898)

Synonyms
- Hydrocampa cannalis Quaintance, 1898; Nymphula camalis Klima, 1937

Genus of moths

Geshna is a monotypic moth genus of the family Crambidae described by Harrison Gray Dyar Jr. in 1906. It contains only one species, Geshna cannalis, the lesser canna leafroller, described by Altus Lacy Quaintance in 1898. It is found in North America, where it has been recorded from Florida, Mississippi, South Carolina, North Carolina and Tennessee. It has also been recorded from Costa Rica and Cuba.

The wingspan is 20–25 mm. Adults are on wing from February to May, from July to August and from November to December.
