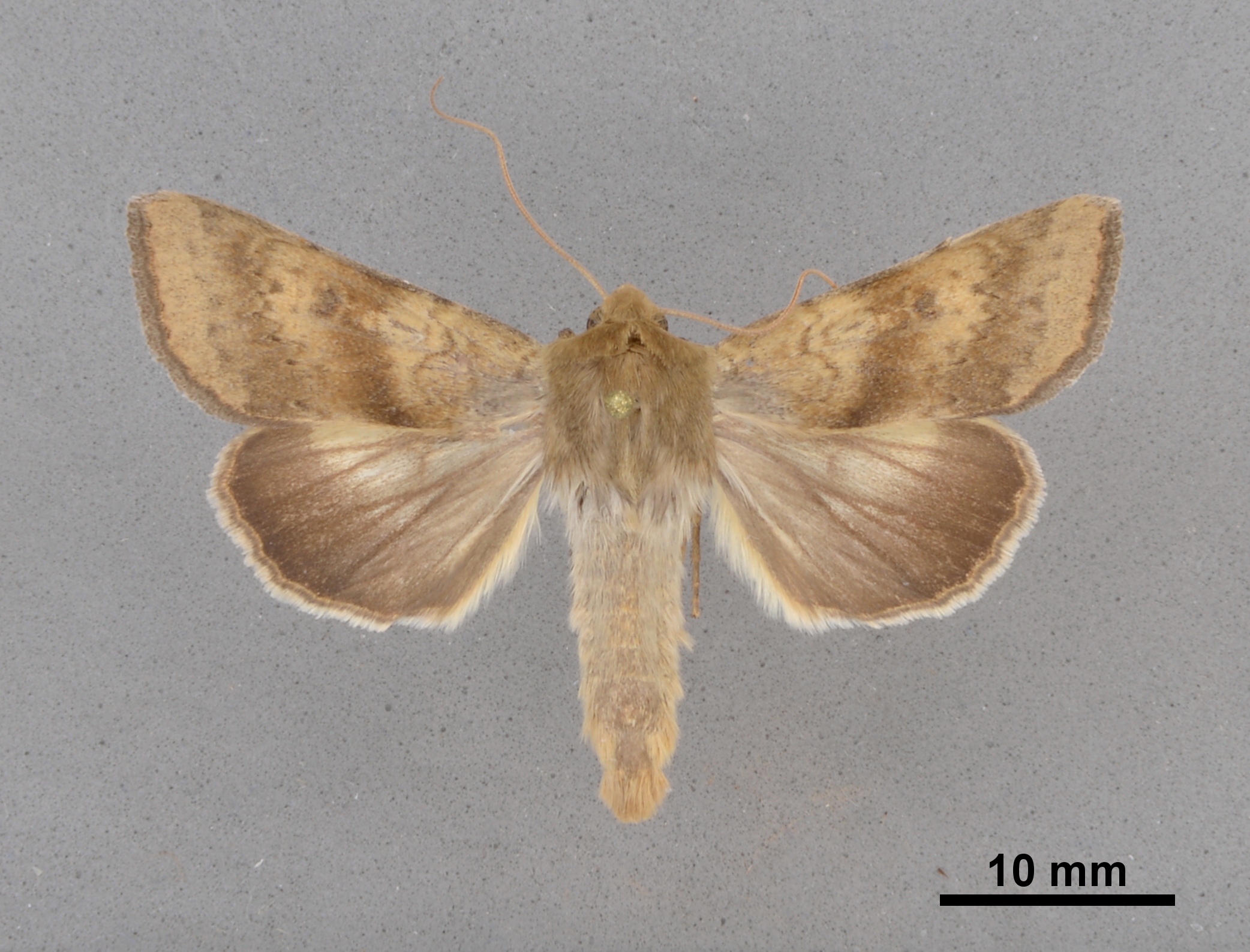

Scientific classification
- Domain: Eukaryota
- Kingdom: Animalia
- Phylum: Arthropoda
- Class: Insecta
- Order: Lepidoptera
- Superfamily: Noctuoidea
- Family: Noctuidae
- Genus: Helicoverpa
- Species: H. hawaiiensis

Binomial name
- Helicoverpa hawaiiensis (Quaintance & Brues, 1905)

Synonyms
- Chloridea armigera hawaiiensis; Chloridea obsoleta signata; Heliothis hawaiiensis (Quaintance and Brues, 1905); Heliothis obsoleta var. hawaiiensis Quaintance and Brues, 1905; Chloridea obsoleta signata Warren, 1912; Chloridea armigera ab. hawaiiensis Strand, 1916; Chloridea obsoleta (misidentification); Heliothis obsoleta (misidentification); Heliothis armigera (misidentification); Chloridea armigera (misidentification); Heliothis conferta (misidentification)

= Helicoverpa hawaiiensis =

Species of moth

Helicoverpa hawaiiensis, the Hawaiian bud moth, is a species of moth of the family Noctuidae. It was first described by Altus Lacy Quaintance and Charles Thomas Brues in 1905. It is endemic to Hawaii, where it is known from Kauaʻi, Oʻahu, Molokaʻi, Maui, Lanaʻi, Hawaiʻi, Nīhoa and Necker Island.

Recorded food plants include Gnaphalium and Sida species.
