= Scania (moth) =

Scientific classification
- Domain: Eukaryota
- Kingdom: Animalia
- Phylum: Arthropoda
- Class: Insecta
- Order: Lepidoptera
- Superfamily: Noctuoidea
- Family: Noctuidae
- Subfamily: Noctuinae
- Genus: Scania; Olivares, 1994

Genus of moths

Scania is a genus of moths of the family Noctuidae. It is the sister group of Pseudoleucania.

== Species ==
- Scania anelluspinata Olivares, 1994
- Scania aspersa (Butler, 1882)
- Scania messia (Guenée, 1852)
- Scania neuquensis (Köhler, 1959)
- Scania odontoclasper Olivares, 1994
- Scania perlucida (Köhler, 1967)
- Scania perornata (Köhler, 1959)
- Scania simillima (Köhler, 1959)
- Scania strigigrapha (Hampson, 1905)
- Scania tephra (Köhler, 1945)
