= J. carnea =

J. carnea may refer to:

- Janaesia carnea, a South American moth
- Justicia carnea, a flowering plant
