= R. carnea =

R. carnea may refer to:

- Reineckea carnea, a vascular plant
- Richia carnea, a South American moth
