= Beriotisia =

Scientific classification
- Domain: Eukaryota
- Kingdom: Animalia
- Phylum: Arthropoda
- Class: Insecta
- Order: Lepidoptera
- Superfamily: Noctuoidea
- Family: Noctuidae
- Subfamily: Noctuinae
- Genus: Beriotisia; Köhler, 1967

Genus of moths

Beriotisia is a genus of moths of the family Noctuidae.

== Selected species ==
- Beriotisia copahuensis (Köhler, 1967)
- Beriotisia cuculliformis (Köhler, 1945)
- Beriotisia fueguensis (Hampson, 1907)
- Beriotisia taniae Angulo & Olivares, 1999
- Beriotisia typhlina (Mabille, 1885)
