= Peridroma chersotoides =

Scientific classification
- Domain: Eukaryota
- Kingdom: Animalia
- Phylum: Arthropoda
- Class: Insecta
- Order: Lepidoptera
- Superfamily: Noctuoidea
- Family: Noctuidae
- Genus: Peridroma
- Species: P. chersotoides

Binomial name
- Peridroma chersotoides (Butler, 1881)

Synonyms
- Apamea chersotoides Butler, 1881; Agrotis chersotoides; Rhyacia chersotoides

Species of moth

Peridroma chersotoides is a moth of the family Noctuidae. It was first described by Arthur Gardiner Butler in 1881. It is endemic to the Hawaiian island of Maui. It has also been recorded from the islands of Molokai and Hawaii, but these references may be in error.

Larvae possibly feed on pokeweed.
