= Helicoverpa hardwicki =

Scientific classification
- Domain: Eukaryota
- Kingdom: Animalia
- Phylum: Arthropoda
- Class: Insecta
- Order: Lepidoptera
- Superfamily: Noctuoidea
- Family: Noctuidae
- Genus: Helicoverpa
- Species: H. hardwicki

Binomial name
- Helicoverpa hardwicki Matthews, 1999

Species of moth

Helicoverpa hardwicki is a species of moth of the family Noctuidae. It is endemic to the Northern Territory and Western Australia.

Larvae have been reared on Crotalaria crispata and Rhyncosia minima.
