= Euxoamorpha =

Scientific classification
- Domain: Eukaryota
- Kingdom: Animalia
- Phylum: Arthropoda
- Class: Insecta
- Order: Lepidoptera
- Superfamily: Noctuoidea
- Family: Noctuidae
- Subfamily: Noctuinae
- Genus: Euxoamorpha; Franclemont, 1950

Genus of moths

Euxoamorpha is a genus of moths of the family Noctuidae.

== Selected species ==
- Euxoamorpha ceciliae Angulo & Rodríguez, 1998
- Euxoamorpha eschata Franclemont, 1950
- Euxoamorpha ingoufii (Mabille, 1885)
- Euxoamorpha mendosica (Hampson, 1903)
- Euxoamorpha molibdoida (Staudinger, 1899)
