= Rachiplusia grisea =

Scientific classification
- Domain: Eukaryota
- Kingdom: Animalia
- Phylum: Arthropoda
- Class: Insecta
- Order: Lepidoptera
- Superfamily: Noctuoidea
- Family: Noctuidae
- Genus: Rachiplusia
- Species: R. grisea

Binomial name
- Rachiplusia grisea Barbut, 2008

Species of moth

Rachiplusia grisea is a species of moth of the family Noctuidae. It is found in South America, including Peru.
