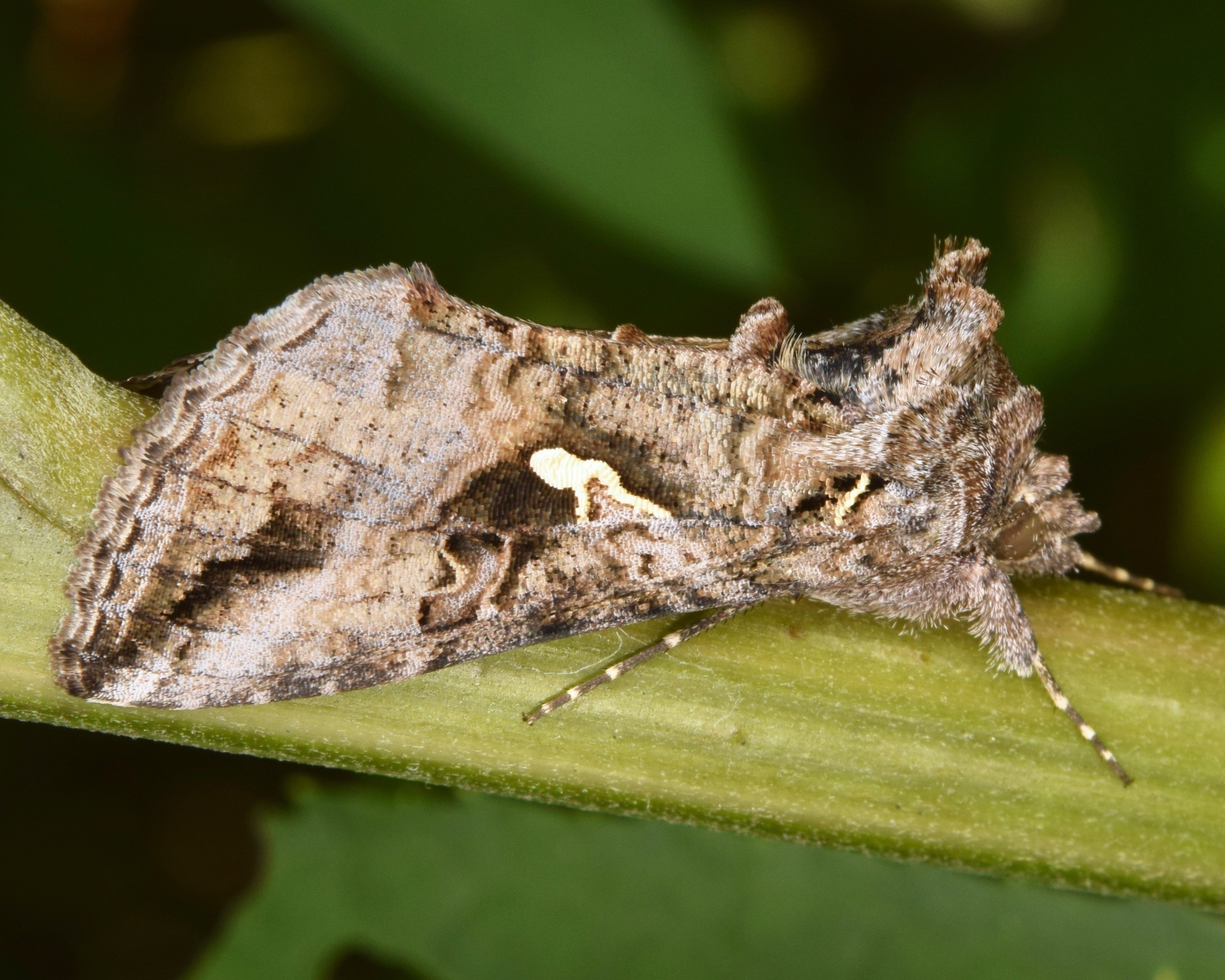
- Rachiplusia ou

Scientific classification
- Kingdom: Animalia
- Phylum: Arthropoda
- Class: Insecta
- Order: Lepidoptera
- Superfamily: Noctuoidea
- Family: Noctuidae
- Subtribe: Autoplusiina
- Genus: Rachiplusia; Hampson, 1913

= Rachiplusia =

Genus of moths

Rachiplusia is a genus of moths of the family Noctuidae.

== Species ==
- Rachiplusia grisea Barbut, 2008
- Rachiplusia nu Guenée, 1852
- Rachiplusia ou Guenée, 1852
- Rachiplusia virgula Blanchard, 1852
