= Helicoverpa helenae =

Scientific classification
- Kingdom: Animalia
- Phylum: Arthropoda
- Clade: Pancrustacea
- Class: Insecta
- Order: Lepidoptera
- Superfamily: Noctuoidea
- Family: Noctuidae
- Genus: Helicoverpa
- Species: H. helenae

Binomial name
- Helicoverpa helenae Hardwick, 1965

Species of moth

Helicoverpa helenae is a species of moth of the family Noctuidae first described by David F. Hardwick in 1965. It is endemic to the island of Saint Helena. The species may be a synonym of Helicoverpa insularis, though there are no contemporary specimens of H. insularis to thoroughly evaluate their potential synonymy.

While it appears on a checklist for South Africa, H. helenae appears to only have a recorded distribution on Saint Helena (H. insularis also occurs on Ascension Island, Tristan da Cunha.
