= Helicoverpa toddi =

Scientific classification
- Domain: Eukaryota
- Kingdom: Animalia
- Phylum: Arthropoda
- Class: Insecta
- Order: Lepidoptera
- Superfamily: Noctuoidea
- Family: Noctuidae
- Genus: Helicoverpa
- Species: H. toddi

Binomial name
- Helicoverpa toddi Hardwick, 1965

Species of moth

Helicoverpa toddi is a species of moth of the family Noctuidae first described by David F. Hardwick in 1965. It is found in central and southern Africa, including South Africa and Madagascar.
