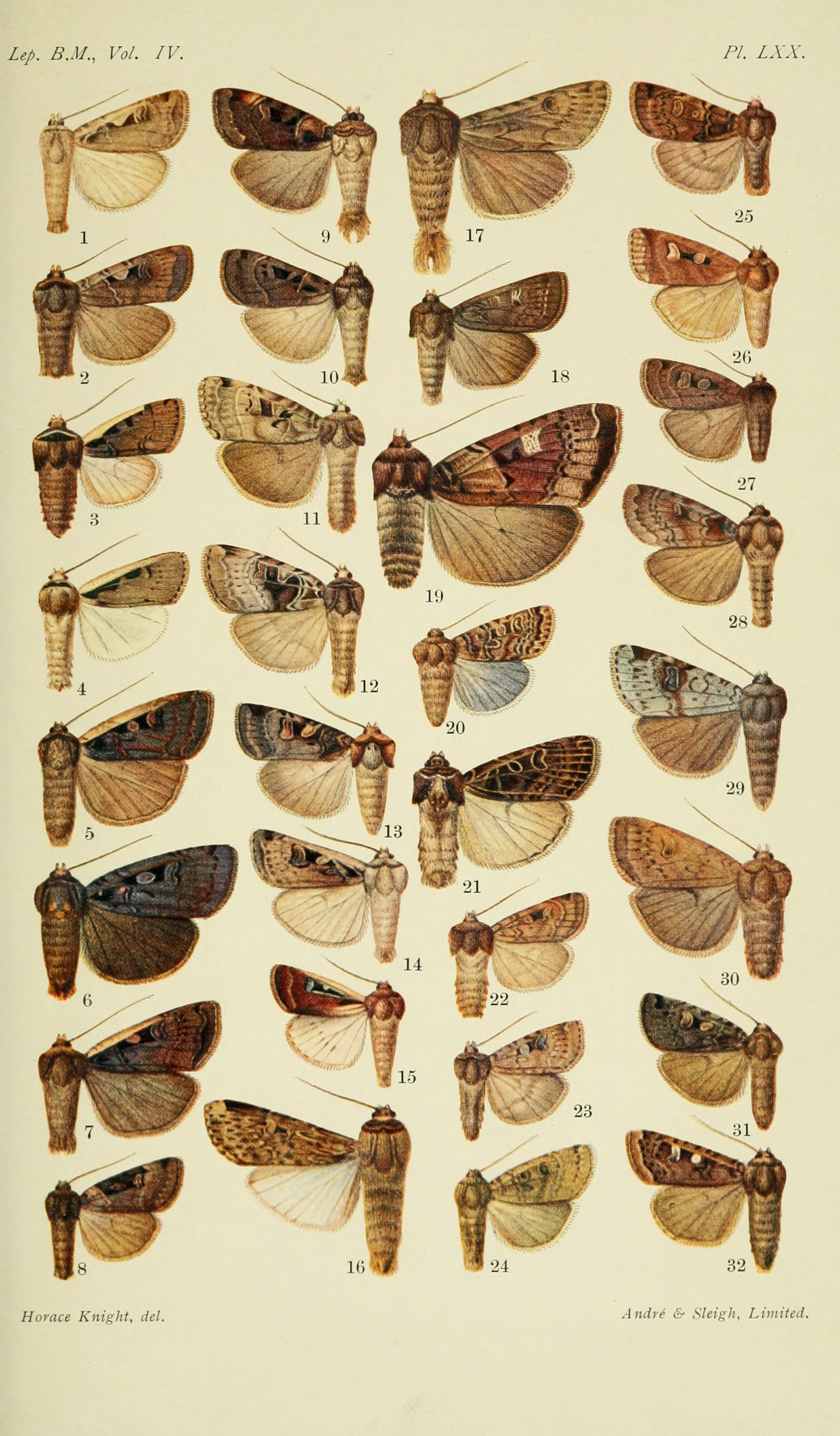

Scientific classification
- Domain: Eukaryota
- Kingdom: Animalia
- Phylum: Arthropoda
- Class: Insecta
- Order: Lepidoptera
- Superfamily: Noctuoidea
- Family: Noctuidae
- Genus: Peridroma
- Species: P. cinctipennis

Binomial name
- Peridroma cinctipennis (Butler, 1881)

Synonyms
- Apamea cinctipennis Butler, 1881; Agrotis cinctipennis; Rhyacia cinctipennis

= Peridroma cinctipennis =

Species of moth

Peridroma cinctipennis is a moth of the family Noctuidae. It was first described by Arthur Gardiner Butler in 1881. It is endemic to the Hawaiian islands of Kauai, Oahu, Molokai, Maui and Hawaii.

The larvae feed on Aleurites moluccanus, Cheirodendron, various grasses, Lythrum, mango, Metrosideros, Pittosporum, Sonchus and Wikstroemia species.

== Subspecies ==
- Peridroma cinctipennis cinctipennis (Kauai, Oahu, Molokai, Maui, Hawaii)
- Peridroma cinctipennis albistigma (Warren, 1912) (Oahu)
