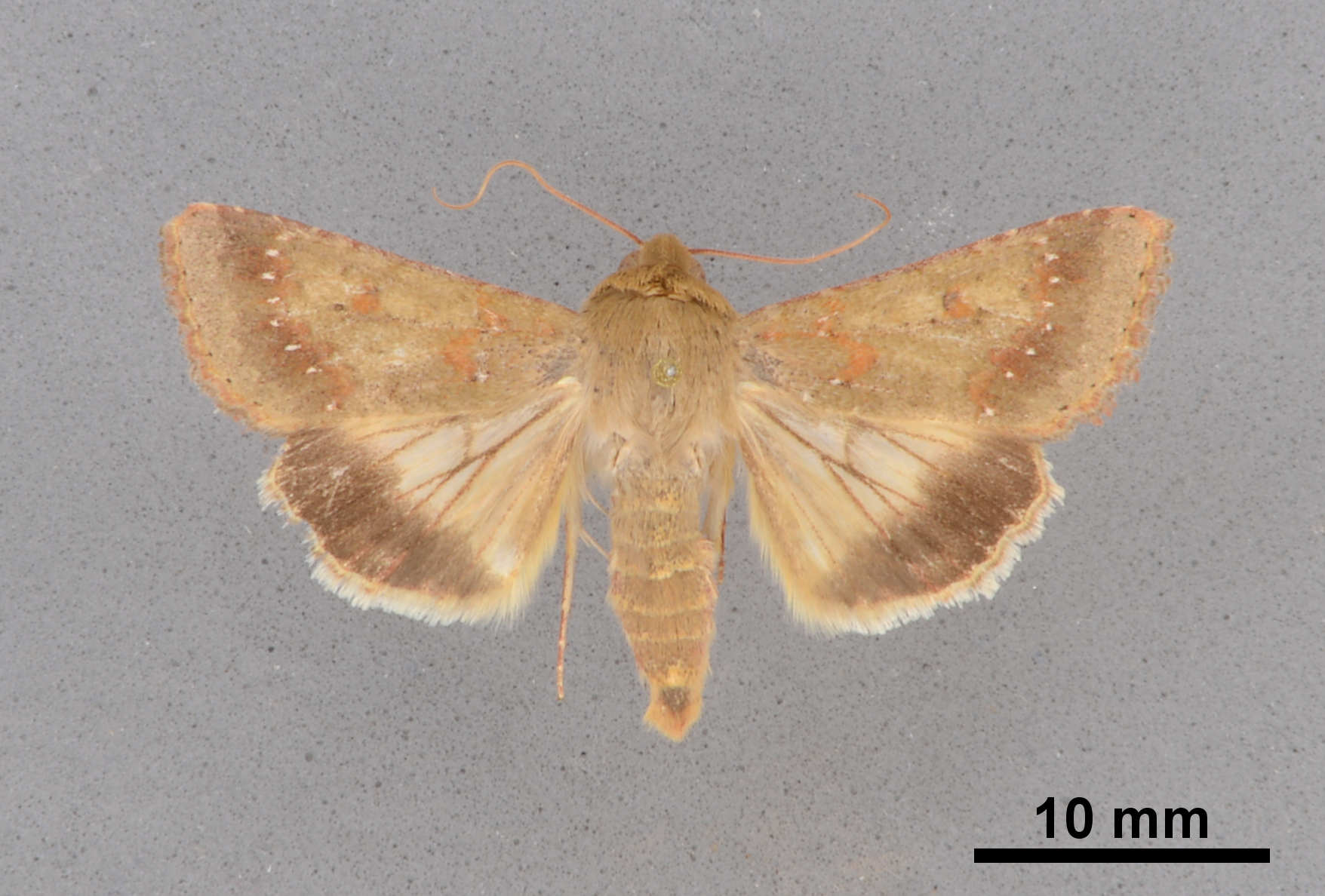

Scientific classification
- Domain: Eukaryota
- Kingdom: Animalia
- Phylum: Arthropoda
- Class: Insecta
- Order: Lepidoptera
- Superfamily: Noctuoidea
- Family: Noctuidae
- Genus: Helicoverpa
- Species: H. fletcheri

Binomial name
- Helicoverpa fletcheri Hardwick, 1965

= Helicoverpa fletcheri =

Species of moth

Helicoverpa fletcheri is a species of moth of the family Noctuidae that is found in Africa, including Sudan.

It is considered a minor pest on Sesamum indicum.
