= Peridroma coniotis =

Scientific classification
- Kingdom: Animalia
- Phylum: Arthropoda
- Class: Insecta
- Order: Lepidoptera
- Superfamily: Noctuoidea
- Family: Noctuidae
- Genus: Peridroma
- Species: P. coniotis

Binomial name
- Peridroma coniotis (Hampson, 1903)

Synonyms
- Agrotis coniotis Hampson, 1903; Rhyacia conistis (misspelling)

Species of moth

Peridroma coniotis is a moth of the family Noctuidae. It was first described by George Hampson in 1903. It is endemic to the Hawaiian islands of Kauai and Hawaii.

The larvae feed on Chenopodium species.

== Subspecies ==
- Peridroma coniotis coniotis (Kauai, Hawaii)
- Peridroma coniotis rufata (Warren, 1912) (Kauai)
