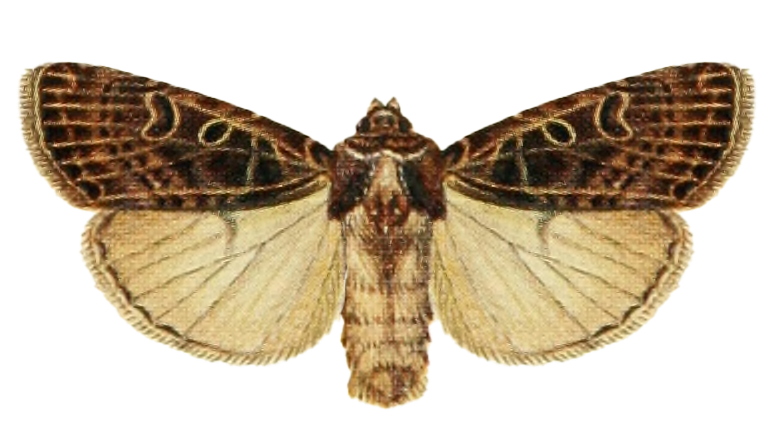
- A male peridroma neurogramma

Scientific classification
- Domain: Eukaryota
- Kingdom: Animalia
- Phylum: Arthropoda
- Class: Insecta
- Order: Lepidoptera
- Superfamily: Noctuoidea
- Family: Noctuidae
- Genus: Peridroma
- Species: P. neurogramma

Binomial name
- Peridroma neurogramma (Meyrick, 1899)

Synonyms
- Agrotis neurogramma Meyrick, 1899; Rhyacia neurogramma

= Peridroma neurogramma =

Species of moth

Peridroma neurogramma is a moth of the family Noctuidae. It was first described by Edward Meyrick in 1899. It is endemic to the island of Hawaii.
