= Phaenagrotis =

Scientific classification
- Domain: Eukaryota
- Kingdom: Animalia
- Phylum: Arthropoda
- Class: Insecta
- Order: Lepidoptera
- Superfamily: Noctuoidea
- Family: Noctuidae
- Subfamily: Noctuinae
- Genus: Phaenagrotis; Köhler, 1953

Genus of moths

Phaenagrotis is a genus of moths of the family Noctuidae.

== Selected species ==
- Phaenagrotis hecateia Köhler, 1953
