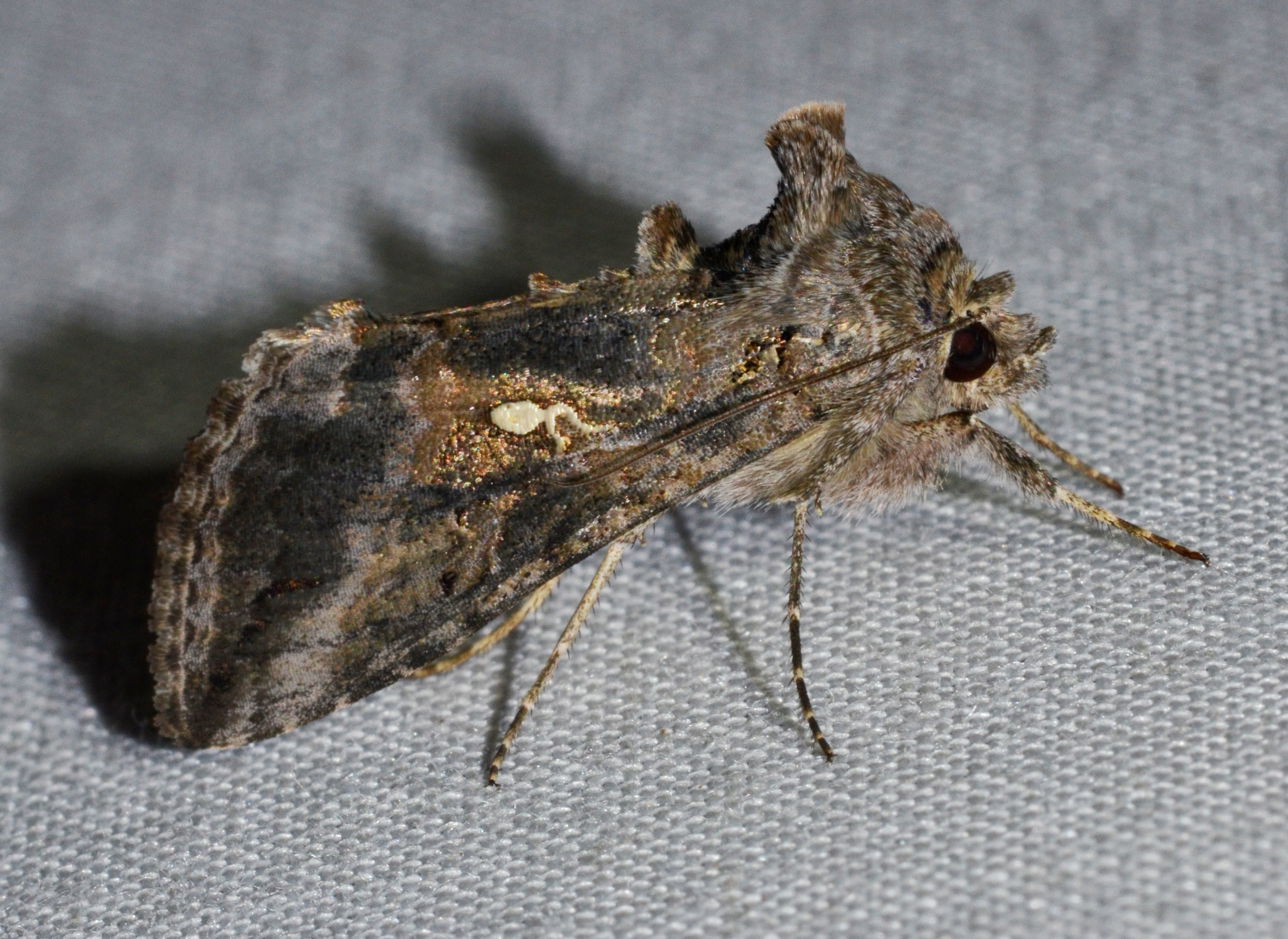

Scientific classification
- Kingdom: Animalia
- Phylum: Arthropoda
- Class: Insecta
- Order: Lepidoptera
- Superfamily: Noctuoidea
- Family: Noctuidae
- Genus: Rachiplusia
- Species: R. ou

Binomial name
- Rachiplusia ou (Guenée, 1852)

Synonyms
- Plusia ou Guenée, 1852; Plusia fratella Grote, 1874; Plusia pedalis Grote, 1875; Plusia tenaculum Guenée, 1852

= Rachiplusia ou =

Species of moth

Rachiplusia ou, commonly known as the gray looper moth, is a species of moth in the family Noctuidae. The species was first described by Achille Guenée in 1852. It is found in the southern and eastern parts of the United States, Montana, Nova Scotia, from Mexico to Venezuela to Ecuador and the Dominican Republic.

The wingspan is 31–41 mm. Adults are on wing from May to October or year round in the southern states.

The larvae feed on various herbaceous plants, including Chenopodium ambrosioides, Nicotiana tabacum, Trifolium, Mentha, Triticum aestivum and Tropaeolum.
