= Helicoverpa pallida =

Scientific classification
- Domain: Eukaryota
- Kingdom: Animalia
- Phylum: Arthropoda
- Class: Insecta
- Order: Lepidoptera
- Superfamily: Noctuoidea
- Family: Noctuidae
- Genus: Helicoverpa
- Species: H. pallida

Binomial name
- Helicoverpa pallida Hardwick, 1965

Species of moth

Helicoverpa pallida is a species of moth of the family Noctuidae. It is endemic to Hawaii.

== Subspecies ==
- Helicoverpa pallida nihoaensis (Nihoa Island)
- Helicoverpa pallida pallida
