= Peridroma albiorbis =

Scientific classification
- Domain: Eukaryota
- Kingdom: Animalia
- Phylum: Arthropoda
- Class: Insecta
- Order: Lepidoptera
- Superfamily: Noctuoidea
- Family: Noctuidae
- Genus: Peridroma
- Species: P. albiorbis

Binomial name
- Peridroma albiorbis (Warren, 1912)

Species of moth

Peridroma albiorbis is a moth of the family Noctuidae. It was first described by William Warren in 1912. It is endemic to the island of Hawaii.

Larvae have been recorded feeding on māmane seeds.
