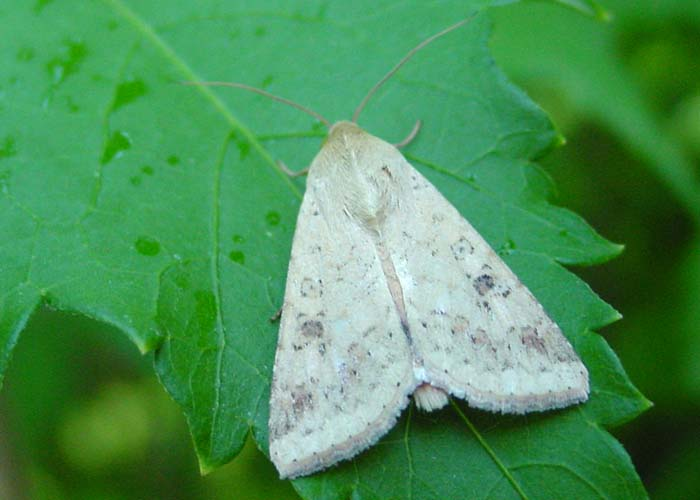
- Helicoverpa armigera

Scientific classification
- Kingdom: Animalia
- Phylum: Arthropoda
- Class: Insecta
- Order: Lepidoptera
- Superfamily: Noctuoidea
- Family: Noctuidae
- Subfamily: Heliothinae
- Genus: Helicoverpa; Hardwick, 1965

= Helicoverpa =

Genus of moths

Helicoverpa is a genus of moths in the family Noctuidae first described by David F. Hardwick in 1965. Some species are among the worst Lepidopteran agricultural pests in the world, and three species (H. armigera, H. zea, and H. punctigera) migrate long distances both with and without human transportation, mixing resistance alleles along the way.

== Extant species ==
- Helicoverpa armigera (Hübner, 1805) – cotton bollworm
- Helicoverpa assulta (Guenée, 1852)
- Helicoverpa atacamae Hardwick, 1965
- Helicoverpa fletcheri Hardwick, 1965
- Helicoverpa gelotopoeon (Dyar, 1921)
- Helicoverpa hardwicki Matthews, 1999
- Helicoverpa hawaiiensis Quaintance & Brues, 1905
- Helicoverpa helenae Hardwick, 1965
- Helicoverpa pallida Hardwick, 1965
- Helicoverpa prepodes Common, 1985
- Helicoverpa punctigera Wallengren, 1860
- Helicoverpa titicacae Hardwick, 1965
- Helicoverpa toddi Hardwick, 1965
- Helicoverpa zea Boddie, 1850

== Extinct species ==
- Confused moth (Helicoverpa confusa)
- Minute noctuid moth (Helicoverpa minuta)
