= Pareuxoa =

Scientific classification
- Kingdom: Animalia
- Phylum: Arthropoda
- Clade: Pancrustacea
- Class: Insecta
- Order: Lepidoptera
- Superfamily: Noctuoidea
- Family: Noctuidae
- Subfamily: Noctuinae
- Genus: Pareuxoa; Forbes, 1933

Genus of moths

Pareuxoa is a genus of moths of the family Noctuidae.

== Selected species ==
- Pareuxoa flavicosta (Wallengren, 1860)
- Pareuxoa fuscata Angulo & Olivares, 1999
- Pareuxoa gravida (Mabille, 1885)
- Pareuxoa janae Angulo, 1990
- Pareuxoa koehleri Olivares, 1992
- Pareuxoa lineifera (Blanchard, 1852)
- Pareuxoa luteicosta Angulo & Olivares, 1999
- Pareuxoa meditata Köhler, 1967
- Pareuxoa nigrolineata (Jana-Sáenz, 1989)
- Pareuxoa parajanae Olivares, 1992
- Pareuxoa perdita (Staudinger, 1889)
- Pareuxoa sanctisebastiani Köhler, 1954
