= Janaesia =

Scientific classification
- Domain: Eukaryota
- Kingdom: Animalia
- Phylum: Arthropoda
- Class: Insecta
- Order: Lepidoptera
- Superfamily: Noctuoidea
- Family: Noctuidae
- Subfamily: Noctuinae
- Genus: Janaesia; Angulo, 1993

Genus of moths

Janaesia is a genus of moths of the family Noctuidae.

== Selected species ==
- Janaesia antarctica (Staudinger, 1899)
- Janaesia carnea (Druce, 1903)
- Janaesia exclusiva Angulo & Olivares, 1999
- Janaesia hibernans (Köhler, 1968)
