= Helicoverpa prepodes =

Scientific classification
- Domain: Eukaryota
- Kingdom: Animalia
- Phylum: Arthropoda
- Class: Insecta
- Order: Lepidoptera
- Superfamily: Noctuoidea
- Family: Noctuidae
- Genus: Helicoverpa
- Species: H. prepodes

Binomial name
- Helicoverpa prepodes (Common, 1985)

Synonyms
- Heliothis prepodes Common, 1985

Species of moth

Helicoverpa prepodes is a species of moth of the family Noctuidae that is endemic to New South Wales and Queensland.
