= Magnagrotis =

Scientific classification
- Kingdom: Animalia
- Phylum: Arthropoda
- Class: Insecta
- Order: Lepidoptera
- Superfamily: Noctuoidea
- Family: Noctuidae
- Subfamily: Noctuinae
- Genus: Magnagrotis; Angulo & Badilla, 1998

Genus of moths

Magnagrotis is a genus of moths of the family Noctuidae.

== Selected species ==
- Magnagrotis oorti (Köhler, 1945)
