= Noctubourgognea =

Scientific classification
- Domain: Eukaryota
- Kingdom: Animalia
- Phylum: Arthropoda
- Class: Insecta
- Order: Lepidoptera
- Superfamily: Noctuoidea
- Family: Noctuidae
- Subfamily: Noctuinae
- Genus: Noctubourgognea; Köhler, 1954

Genus of moths

Noctubourgognea is a genus of moths of the family Noctuidae.

== Selected species ==
- Noctubourgognea bicolor (Mabille, 1885)
- Noctubourgognea coppingeri (Butler, 1881)
- Noctubourgognea glottuloides (Butler, 1882)
