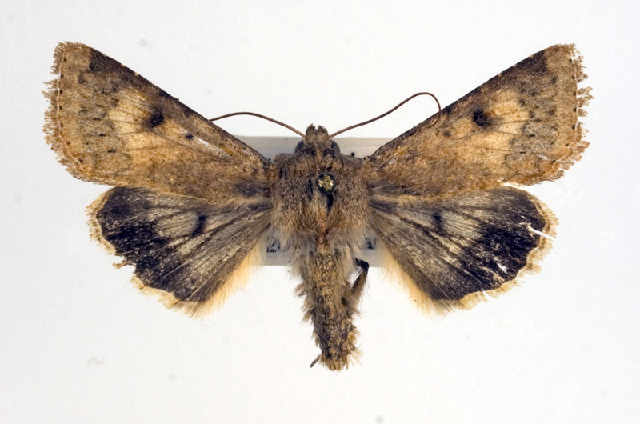

Scientific classification
- Domain: Eukaryota
- Kingdom: Animalia
- Phylum: Arthropoda
- Class: Insecta
- Order: Lepidoptera
- Superfamily: Noctuoidea
- Family: Noctuidae
- Genus: Helicoverpa
- Species: H. titicacae

Binomial name
- Helicoverpa titicacae Hardwick, 1965

= Helicoverpa titicacae =

Helicoverpa titicacae Hardwick, 1965

Species of moth

Helicoverpa titicacae is a species of moth of the family Noctuidae. It is found in Peru.
