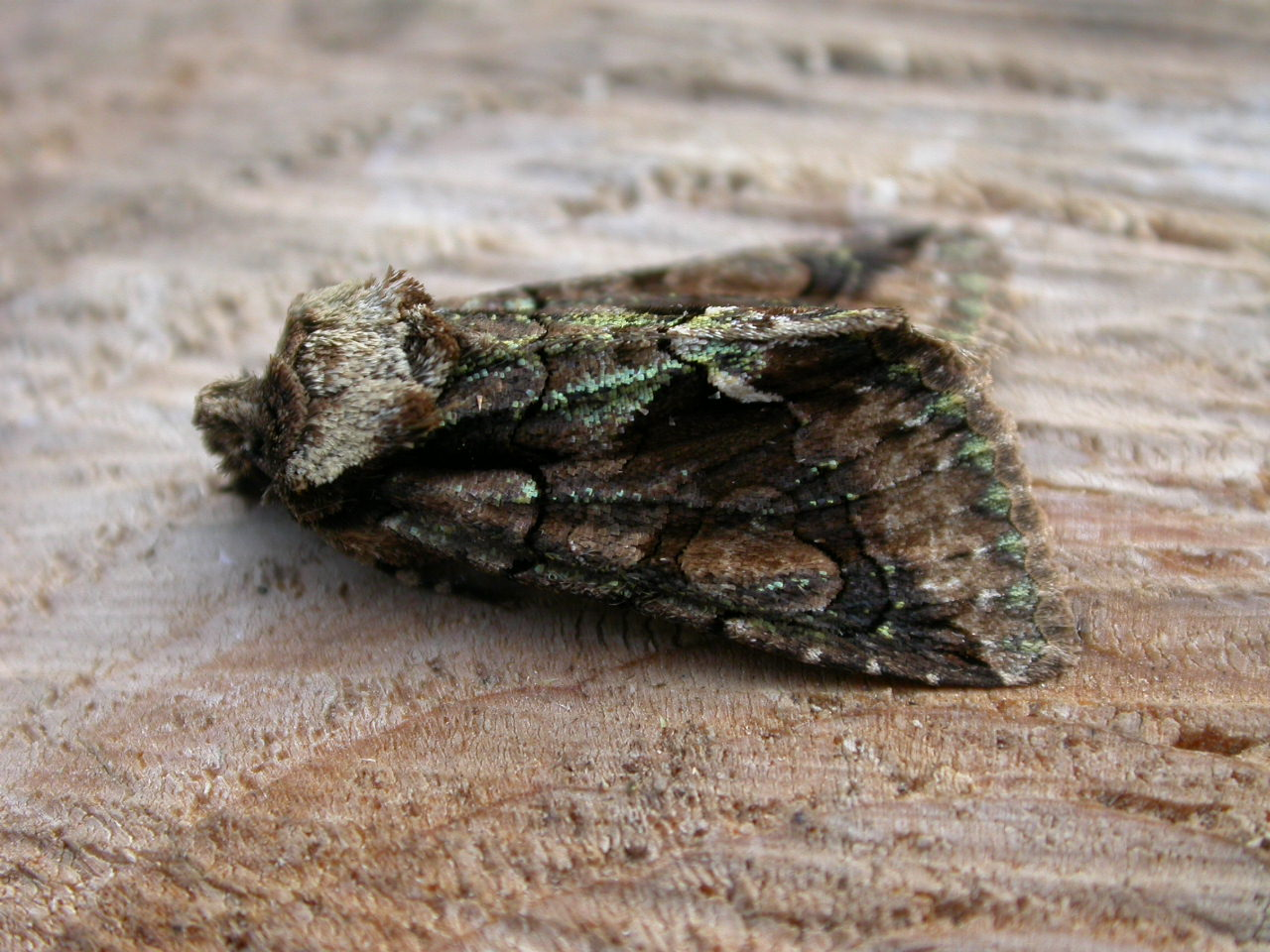

Scientific classification
- Kingdom: Animalia
- Phylum: Arthropoda
- Class: Insecta
- Order: Lepidoptera
- Superfamily: Noctuoidea
- Family: Noctuidae
- Genus: Allophyes
- Species: A. oxyacanthae

Binomial name
- Allophyes oxyacanthae (Linnaeus, 1758)

Synonyms
- Phalaena oxyacanthae Linnaeus, 1758

= Allophyes oxyacanthae =

Species of moth

Allophyes oxyacanthae, the green-brindled crescent, is a moth of the family Noctuidae, found in Europe. The species was described by Carl Linnaeus in his landmark 1758 10th edition of Systema Naturae.

== Technical description and variation ==
M. oxyacanthae L. (31 g). Forewing reddish grey, varied with fuscous; the nervures and inner margin lined with green scales; a strong black streak from base below cell; lines finely black, the inner sharply angled outwards at the end of the basal streak, the outer marked with a bright white crescent on submedian fold; stigmata all large, pale pinky brown, outlined with black; a diffuse black shade to termen below vein 2; submarginal line faintly paler, the area before it generally paler; hindwing luteous whitish in male, grey in female. The form found in Syria, benedictina Stgr. (31 g) [now full species Allophyes benedictina (Staudinger, [1892]) ]has the forewings dark grey brown; the hindwings paler; but those of the female are darker grey; — another form, occurring in Pontus, Palestine and Ussuriland, asiatica Stgr.[ now full species Allophyes asiatica (Staudinger, [1892]) has the fore-wings pale grey; capucina Mill. (31 g h) is a form restricted, apparently, to the British Isles, rich deep brown with darker shading in the male, darker duller brown in the female, with the lines and markings distinct, the hindwings of the male often rufous-tinged; in this the green scaling is altogether absent; — corsica Spul. [now full species Allophyes corsica (Spuler, 1905)] from the Island of Corsica is said to be paler, of a more vivid yellowish red colour; — pallida Tutt, from Ireland and Berkshire, has pale reddish grey forewings, with only a slight amount of green along inner and outer margins. Larva dull slaty grey or brownish grey, covered with irregular-shaped black marks; on each side of segment 4, which is slightly raised, an oblique dark streak; tubercles pale on dark spots; spiracles fine, white, with black rings. The wingspan is 35–45 mm.

== Biology ==
The moth flies from September to November, depending on the location and feeds at ivy-blossom, overripe fruit and comes to sugar. It will drop quickly to the ground when disturbed and remain inert in the leaf litter; it also comes to light.

Ovum

Laid in small batches or singly on tree trunks and overwinters in this stage.

Larva

The eggs hatch in March and the larva feed, at first, in the opening leaf-buds. They feed on hawthorn (Crataegus species), blackthorn (Prunus spinosa), birch (Betula species) and various fruit bearing trees such as wild cherry (Prunus avium). By May or June it is fully fed and rests for several weeks in a large underground cocoon, before pupating.

== Gallery ==
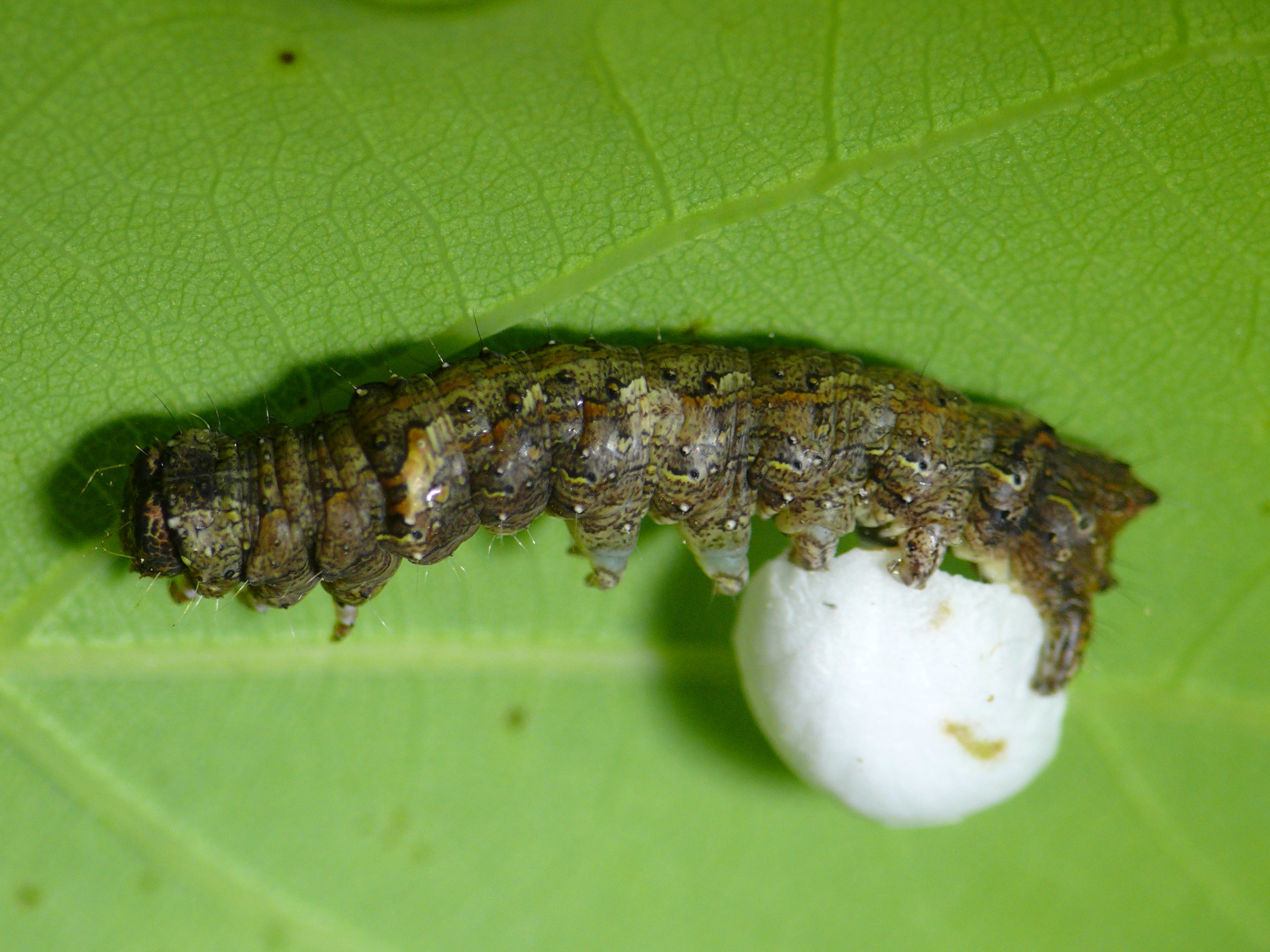
Young larva

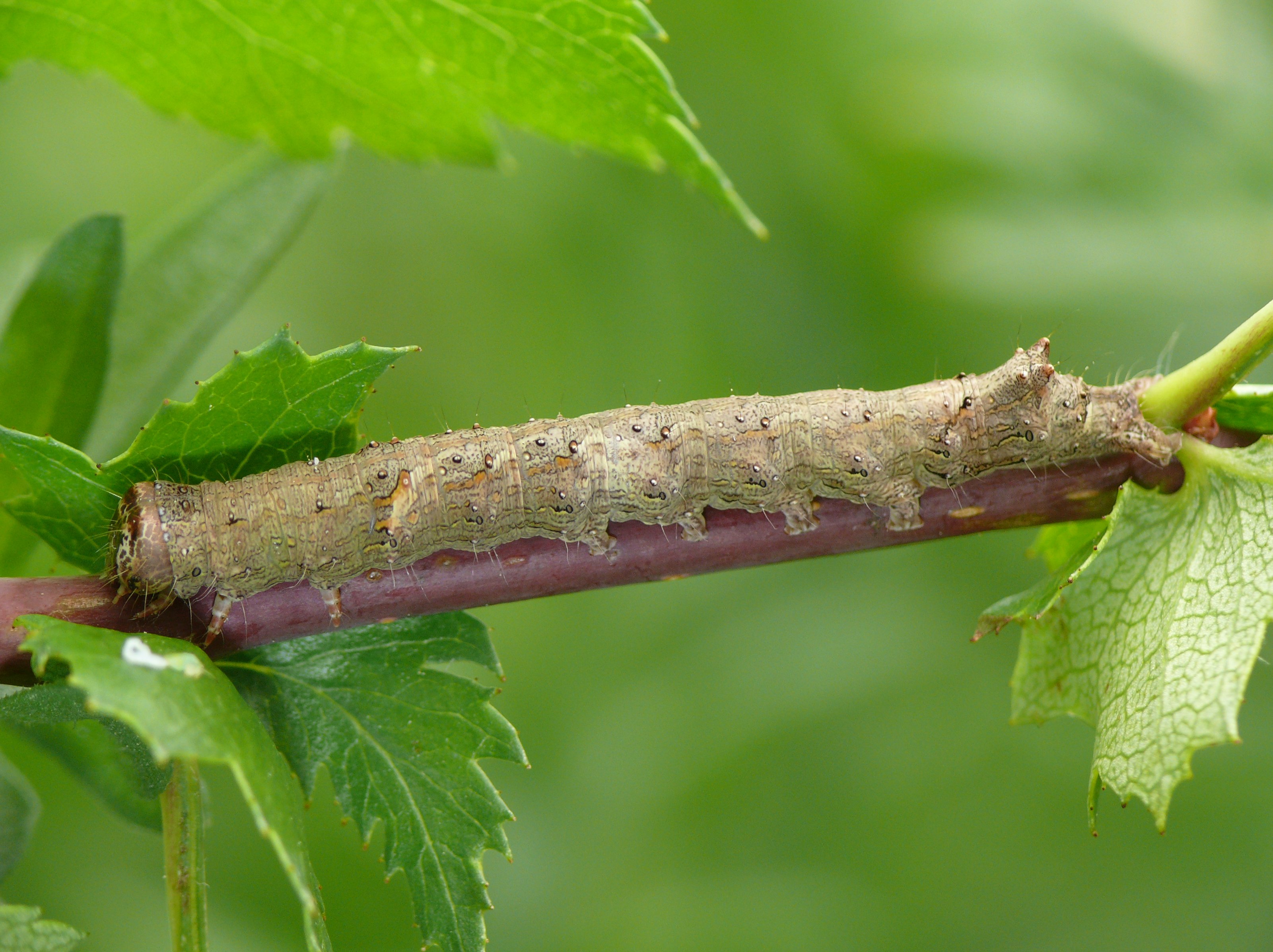
Larva

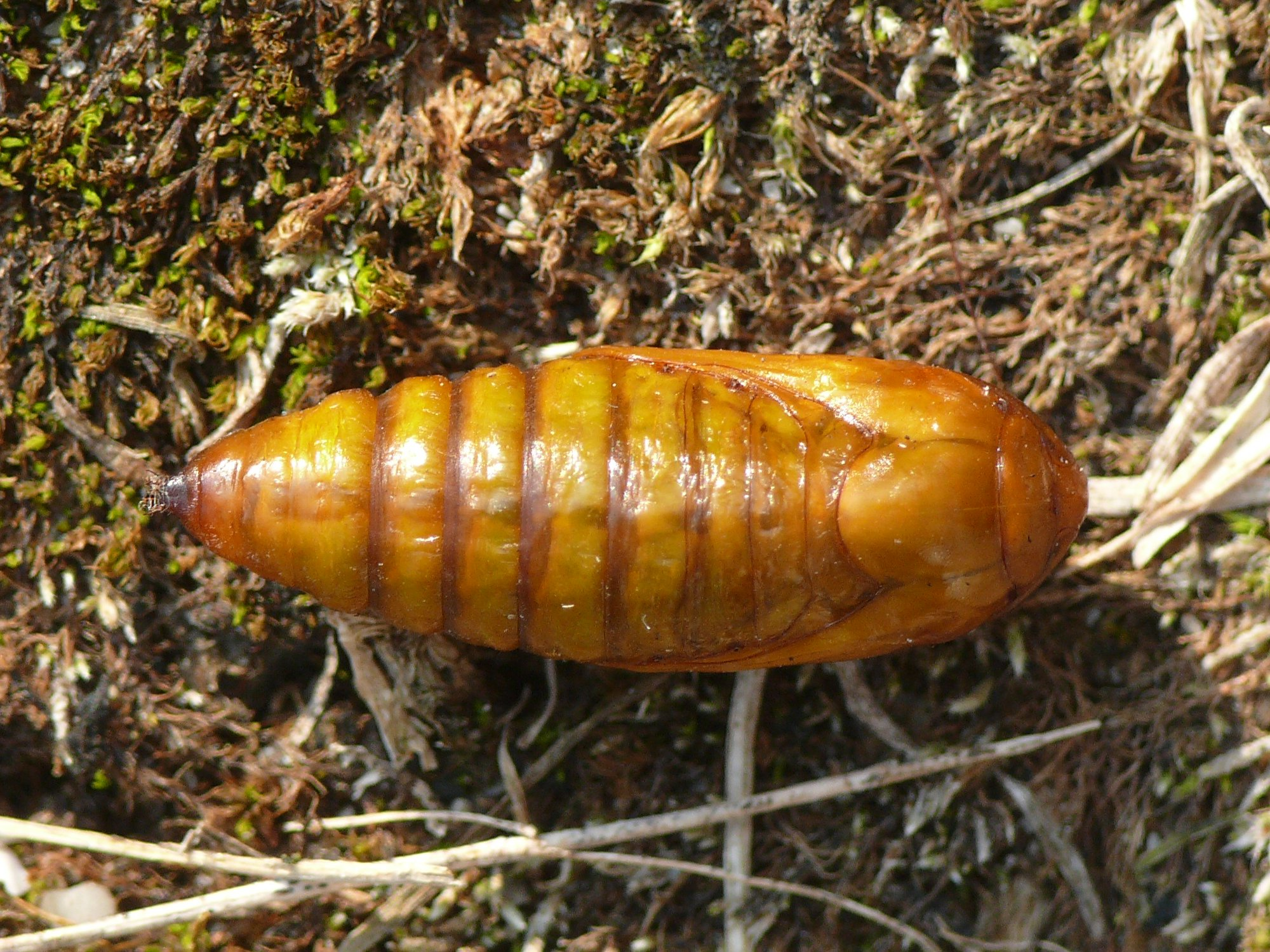
Pupa

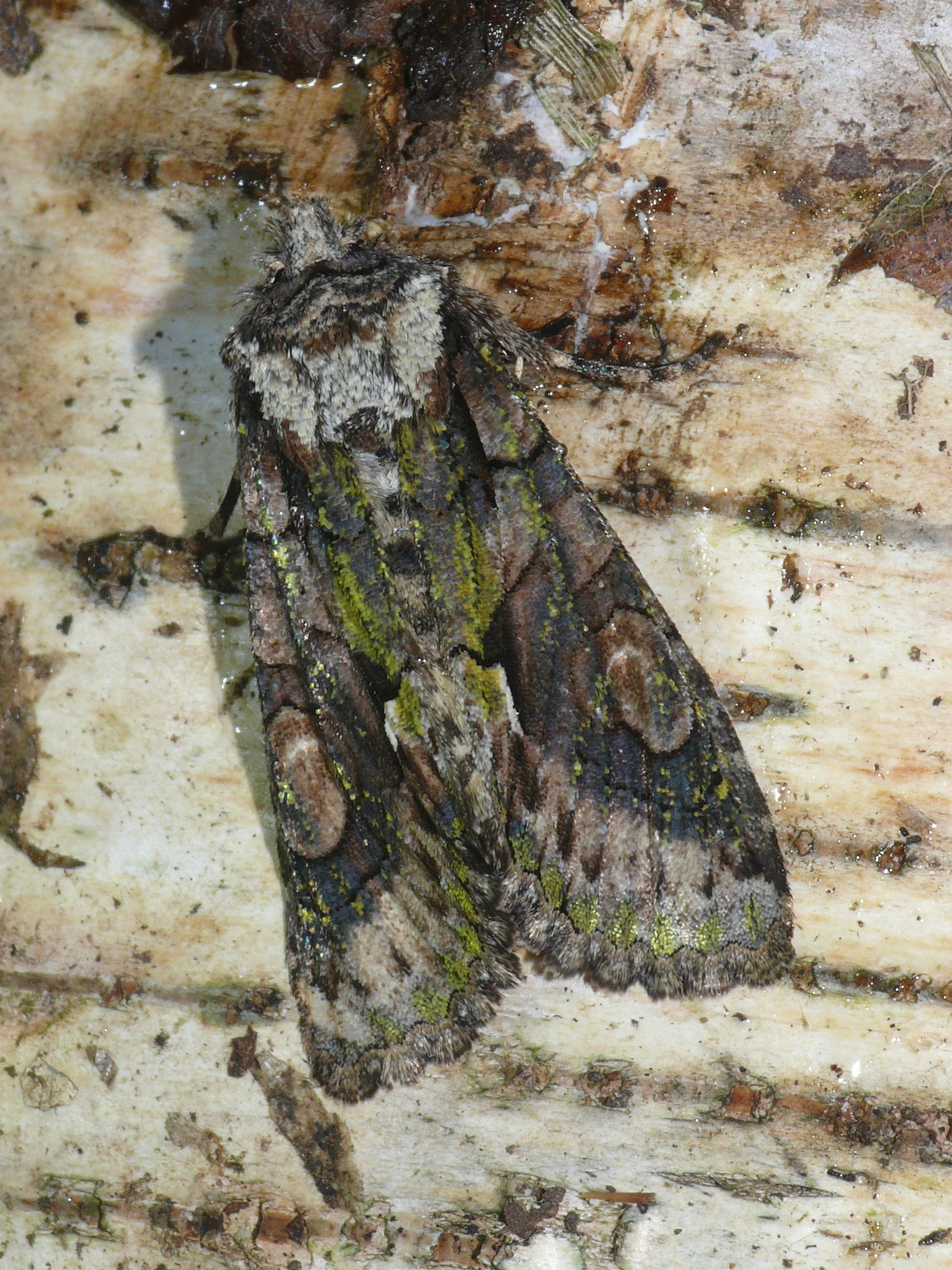
Adult
