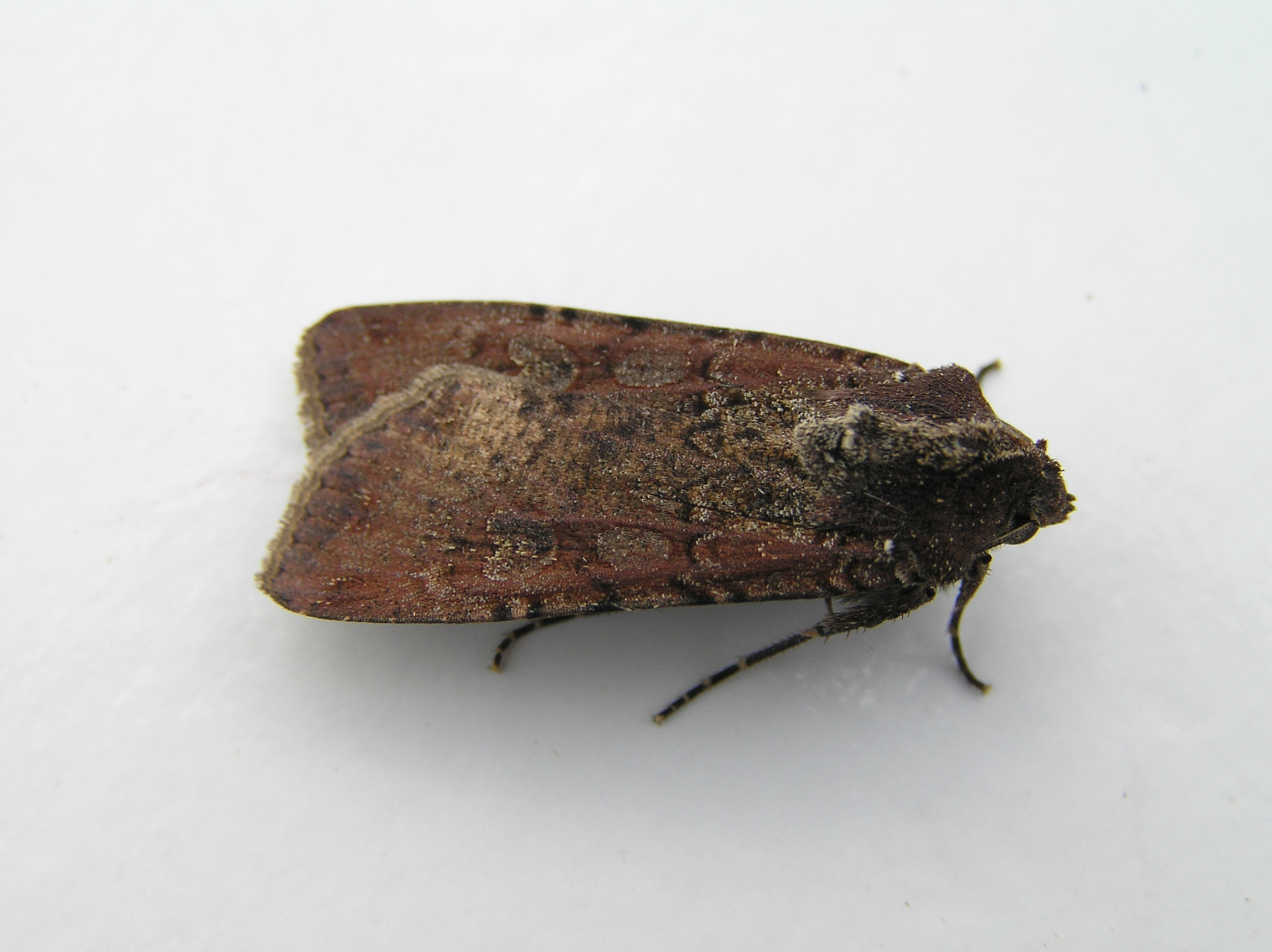
- Peridroma saucia

Scientific classification
- Kingdom: Animalia
- Phylum: Arthropoda
- Clade: Pancrustacea
- Class: Insecta
- Order: Lepidoptera
- Superfamily: Noctuoidea
- Family: Noctuidae
- Tribe: Noctuini
- Genus: Peridroma; Hübner, 1821

= Peridroma =

Genus of moths

Peridroma is a genus of moths of the family Noctuidae.

== Selected species ==
- Peridroma albiorbis (Warren, 1912)
- Peridroma ambrosioides (Walker, 1857)
- Peridroma chersotoides (Butler, 1881)
- Peridroma chilenaria Angulo & Jana-Sáenz, 1984
- Peridroma cinctipennis (Butler, 1881)
- Peridroma clerica (Butler, 1882)
- Peridroma coniotis (Hampson, 1903)
- Peridroma differens (Walker, [1857])
- Peridroma neurogramma (Meyrick, 1899)
- Peridroma saucia (Hübner, [1808])
- Peridroma selenias (Meyrick, 1899)
- Peridroma semidolens (Walker, 1857)
