= Atlantagrotis =

Scientific classification
- Kingdom: Animalia
- Phylum: Arthropoda
- Class: Insecta
- Order: Lepidoptera
- Superfamily: Noctuoidea
- Family: Noctuidae
- Subfamily: Noctuinae
- Genus: Atlantagrotis; Köhler, 1955

Genus of moths

Atlantagrotis is a genus of moths in the family Noctuidae.

== Selected species ==
- Atlantagrotis aethes (Mabille, 1885)
- Atlantagrotis hesperoides (Köhler, 1945)
- Atlantagrotis nelida (Köhler, 1945)
