= Peridroma selenias =

Scientific classification
- Domain: Eukaryota
- Kingdom: Animalia
- Phylum: Arthropoda
- Class: Insecta
- Order: Lepidoptera
- Superfamily: Noctuoidea
- Family: Noctuidae
- Genus: Peridroma
- Species: P. selenias

Binomial name
- Peridroma selenias (Meyrick, 1899)

Synonyms
- Agrotis selenias Meyrick, 1899; Rhyacia selenias

Species of moth

Peridroma selenias is a moth of the family Noctuidae. It was first described by Edward Meyrick in 1899. It is endemic to the Hawaiian islands of Kauai, Oahu and Hawaii.
