= Beriotisia copahuensis =

Scientific classification
- Domain: Eukaryota
- Kingdom: Animalia
- Phylum: Arthropoda
- Class: Insecta
- Order: Lepidoptera
- Superfamily: Noctuoidea
- Family: Noctuidae
- Genus: Beriotisia
- Species: B. copahuensis

Binomial name
- Beriotisia copahuensis Köhler, 1967

Species of moth

Beriotisia copahuensis is a moth of the family Noctuidae. It is found in the Maule Region and Guarello Island in Chile and the Neuquén Province of Argentina.

The wingspan is 34–42 mm. Adults are on wing in January.
