= Peridroma ambrosioides =

Scientific classification
- Kingdom: Animalia
- Phylum: Arthropoda
- Class: Insecta
- Order: Lepidoptera
- Superfamily: Noctuoidea
- Family: Noctuidae
- Genus: Peridroma
- Species: P. ambrosioides

Binomial name
- Peridroma ambrosioides (Walker, 1857)

Synonyms
- Agrotis ambrosioides Walker, 1857

Species of moth

Peridroma ambrosioides is a moth of the family Noctuidae. It is found in the Valparaíso and Biobío Regions of Chile and Buenos Aires, Bahía Blanca and Sierra de la Ventana in Argentina.

The wingspan is 35–45 mm. Adults are on wing from August to April.
