= Pseudoleucania luteomaculata =

Scientific classification
- Kingdom: Animalia
- Phylum: Arthropoda
- Class: Insecta
- Order: Lepidoptera
- Superfamily: Noctuoidea
- Family: Noctuidae
- Genus: Pseudoleucania
- Species: P. luteomaculata

Binomial name
- Pseudoleucania luteomaculata Angulo & Olivares, 2001

Species of moth

Pseudoleucania luteomaculata is a moth of the family Noctuidae. It is found in the Biobío and Maule Regions of Chile.

The wingspan is 31–36 mm. Adults are on wing from February to March.
