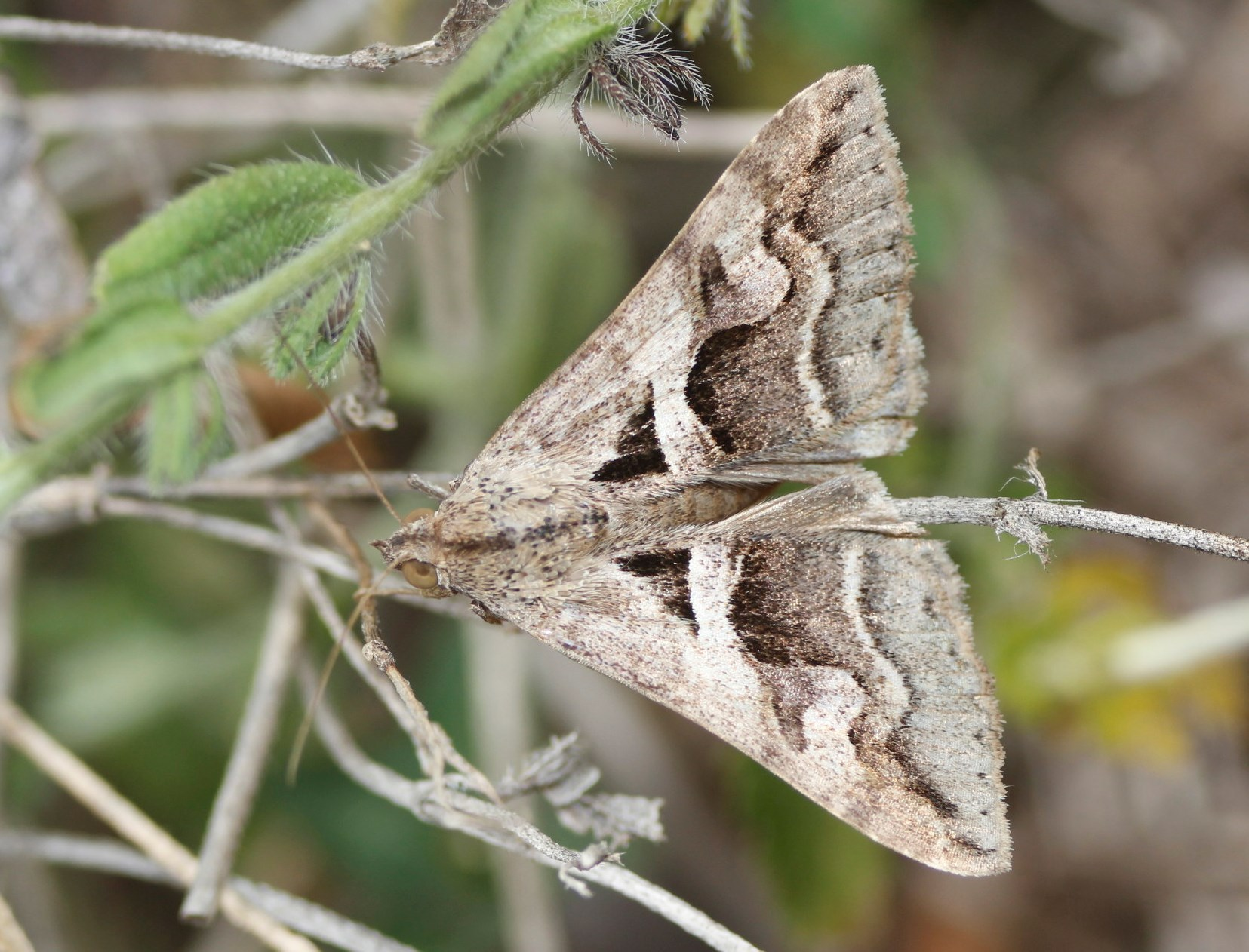

Scientific classification
- Kingdom: Animalia
- Phylum: Arthropoda
- Class: Insecta
- Order: Lepidoptera
- Superfamily: Noctuoidea
- Family: Erebidae
- Genus: Melipotis
- Species: M. cellaris

Binomial name
- Melipotis cellaris (Guenée, 1852)

Synonyms
- Bolina cellaris Guenée, 1852; Bolina bisinuata Felder & Rogenhofer, 1874; Panula insipida Felder & Rogenhofer, 1874; Bolina turbata Walker, 1858

= Melipotis cellaris =

Species of moth

Melipotis cellaris, the cellar melipotis moth, is a species of moth in the family Erebidae. It is found in Mexico (Morelos), Colombia, Venezuela, Paraguay, Argentina, Uruguay, the West Indies and the southern United States, where it has been recorded from Florida, Kansas, Louisiana, New Mexico and Texas.

The wingspan is 35-37 mm. Adults are on wing year round in Texas.
