= Euxoamorpha ceciliae =

Scientific classification
- Kingdom: Animalia
- Phylum: Arthropoda
- Class: Insecta
- Order: Lepidoptera
- Superfamily: Noctuoidea
- Family: Noctuidae
- Genus: Euxoamorpha
- Species: E. ceciliae

Binomial name
- Euxoamorpha ceciliae Angulo & Rodríguez, 1998

Species of moth

Euxoamorpha ceciliae is a moth of the family Noctuidae. It is found in the Maule Region of Chile.

The wingspan is 33–35 mm. Adults are on wing from December to February.
