= Noctubourgognea bicolor =

Scientific classification
- Domain: Eukaryota
- Kingdom: Animalia
- Phylum: Arthropoda
- Class: Insecta
- Order: Lepidoptera
- Superfamily: Noctuoidea
- Family: Noctuidae
- Genus: Noctubourgognea
- Species: N. bicolor

Binomial name
- Noctubourgognea bicolor (Mabille, 1885)

Synonyms
- Agrotis bicolor Mabille, 1885; Noctubourgognea cisandina Köhler, 1954

Species of moth

Noctubourgognea bicolor is a moth of the family Noctuidae. It is found in Bahía Orange, Patagonia, Estrecho de Magallanes and Tierra del Fuego in Chile and the San Martín de los Andes and Neuquén in Argentina.

The wingspan is about 44 mm. Adults are on wing in March.
