= Scania anelluspinata =

Scientific classification
- Domain: Eukaryota
- Kingdom: Animalia
- Phylum: Arthropoda
- Class: Insecta
- Order: Lepidoptera
- Superfamily: Noctuoidea
- Family: Noctuidae
- Genus: Scania
- Species: S. anelluspinata

Binomial name
- Scania anelluspinata Olivares, 1994

Species of moth

Scania anelluspinata is a moth of the family Noctuidae. It is found in the Maule Region of Chile and Río Negro and El Mayoco in Argentina.

The wingspan is about 23 mm. Adults are on wing from in February.
