= Euxoamorpha mendosica =

Scientific classification
- Kingdom: Animalia
- Phylum: Arthropoda
- Class: Insecta
- Order: Lepidoptera
- Superfamily: Noctuoidea
- Family: Noctuidae
- Genus: Euxoamorpha
- Species: E. mendosica

Binomial name
- Euxoamorpha mendosica (Hampson, 1903)

Synonyms
- Lycophotia mendosica Hampson, 1903

Species of moth

Euxoamorpha mendosica is a moth of the family Noctuidae. It is found around Puerto Natales and Punta Arenas in the Magallanes and Antartica Chilena Region of Chile, as well as the Argentine Andes, including the Aconcagua Provincial Park area.

The wingspan is about 35 mm. Adults are on wing from November to February.
