= Pareuxoa koehleri =

Scientific classification
- Kingdom: Animalia
- Phylum: Arthropoda
- Class: Insecta
- Order: Lepidoptera
- Superfamily: Noctuoidea
- Family: Noctuidae
- Genus: Pareuxoa
- Species: P. koehleri

Binomial name
- Pareuxoa koehleri Olivares, 1992

Species of moth

Pareuxoa koehleri is a moth of the family Noctuidae. It is found in Punta Arenas, Termas de Río Blanco and Cautín in Chile.

The wingspan is about 30 mm. Adults are on wing in February.
