= Scania aspersa =

Scientific classification
- Domain: Eukaryota
- Kingdom: Animalia
- Phylum: Arthropoda
- Class: Insecta
- Order: Lepidoptera
- Superfamily: Noctuoidea
- Family: Noctuidae
- Genus: Scania
- Species: S. aspersa

Binomial name
- Scania aspersa (Butler, 1882)

Synonyms
- Spodoptera aspersa Butler, 1882; Paranicla bridarolliana Köhler, 1959

Species of moth

Scania aspersa is a moth of the family Noctuidae. It is found from the Maule Region to the Magallanes and Antartica Chilena Region of Chile, Colonia and Estanzuela in Uruguay and Comodoro Rivadavia, San Martín de los Andes, La Rioja, Cafayate, Salta, Nahuel Huapi, Neuquén, Chubut and Esquel in Argentina.

The wingspan is about 31 mm. Adults are on wing from October to March.
