= Pseudoleucania brosii =

Scientific classification
- Kingdom: Animalia
- Phylum: Arthropoda
- Class: Insecta
- Order: Lepidoptera
- Superfamily: Noctuoidea
- Family: Noctuidae
- Genus: Pseudoleucania
- Species: P. brosii

Binomial name
- Pseudoleucania brosii (Köhler, 1959)

Synonyms
- Paranicla brosii Köhler, 1959

Species of moth

Pseudoleucania brosii is a moth of the family Noctuidae. It is found in the Maule and Magallanes and Antartica Chilena Regions of Chile.

The wingspan is 32–35 mm. Adults are on wing in December.
