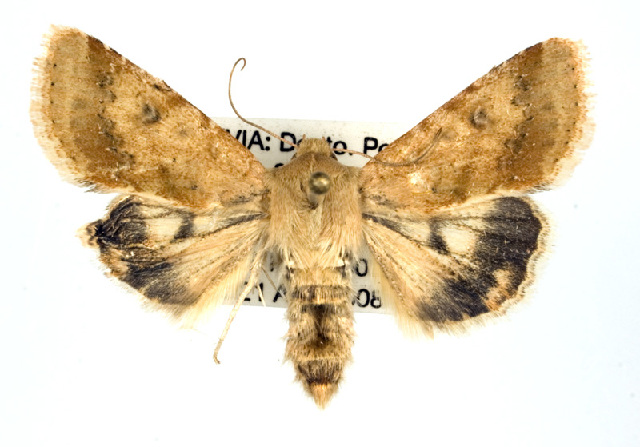

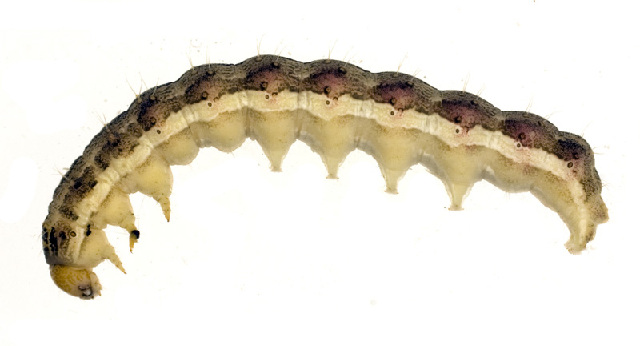
- Larva

Scientific classification
- Domain: Eukaryota
- Kingdom: Animalia
- Phylum: Arthropoda
- Class: Insecta
- Order: Lepidoptera
- Superfamily: Noctuoidea
- Family: Noctuidae
- Genus: Helicoverpa
- Species: H. gelotopoeon

Binomial name
- Helicoverpa gelotopoeon (Dyar, 1921)

Synonyms
- Heliothis gelotopoeon (Dyar, 1921); Thyreion gelotopoeon Dyar, 1921

= Helicoverpa gelotopoeon =

Species of moth

Helicoverpa gelotopoeon, the South American bollworm moth, is a moth of the family Noctuidae. It is found in southern South America, including Chile and Argentina.

The larvae are considered a pest on cotton, corn, tobacco, soybean, flax and other crops.
