= Euxoamorpha eschata =

Scientific classification
- Domain: Eukaryota
- Kingdom: Animalia
- Phylum: Arthropoda
- Class: Insecta
- Order: Lepidoptera
- Superfamily: Noctuoidea
- Family: Noctuidae
- Genus: Euxoamorpha
- Species: E. eschata

Binomial name
- Euxoamorpha eschata Franclemont, 1950

Species of moth

Euxoamorpha eschata is a moth of the family Noctuidae. It is found in the Magallanes and Antartica Chilena Region of Chile and Bariloche and Buenos Aires in Argentina.

The wingspan is 33–35 mm. Adults are on wing from November to February.
