= Pseudoleucania diana =

Scientific classification
- Domain: Eukaryota
- Kingdom: Animalia
- Phylum: Arthropoda
- Class: Insecta
- Order: Lepidoptera
- Superfamily: Noctuoidea
- Family: Noctuidae
- Genus: Pseudoleucania
- Species: P. diana

Binomial name
- Pseudoleucania diana (Butler, 1882)

Synonyms
- Ochropleura diana Butler, 1882

Species of moth

Pseudoleucania diana is a moth of the family Noctuidae. It is found in the Santiago, O'Higgins, Maule, Biobío and Magallanes and Antartica Chilena Regions of Chile and Tierra del Fuego, Chubut, San Martín de los Andes and Río Negro in Argentina.

The wingspan is about 32 mm. Adults are on wing from September to April.
