= Pareuxoa gravida =

Scientific classification
- Domain: Eukaryota
- Kingdom: Animalia
- Phylum: Arthropoda
- Class: Insecta
- Order: Lepidoptera
- Superfamily: Noctuoidea
- Family: Noctuidae
- Genus: Pareuxoa
- Species: P. gravida

Binomial name
- Pareuxoa gravida (Mabille, 1885)

Synonyms
- Agrotis gravida Mabille, 1885; Epipsilia nelidae Orfila & Schachoskoy, 1958

Species of moth

Pareuxoa gravida is a moth of the family Noctuidae. It is found from the Biobío Region to the Magallanes and Antartica Chilena Region of Chile and in Bariloche, Río Negro, San Martín de los Andes, Chubut, Patagonia and Tierra del Fuego in Argentina

The wingspan is about 41 mm. Adults are on wing from December to March.
