= Caenurgia runica =

Scientific classification
- Kingdom: Animalia
- Phylum: Arthropoda
- Class: Insecta
- Order: Lepidoptera
- Superfamily: Noctuoidea
- Family: Erebidae
- Genus: Caenurgia
- Species: C. runica

Binomial name
- Caenurgia runica (Felder & Rogenhofer, 1874)

Synonyms
- Euclidia runica Felder & Rogenhofer, 1874; Euclidia tehuelcha Berg, 1875

Species of moth

Caenurgia runica is a species of moth of the family Erebidae. It is found in Chile and Argentina.
