= Scania perlucida =

Scientific classification
- Domain: Eukaryota
- Kingdom: Animalia
- Phylum: Arthropoda
- Class: Insecta
- Order: Lepidoptera
- Superfamily: Noctuoidea
- Family: Noctuidae
- Genus: Scania
- Species: S. perlucida

Binomial name
- Scania perlucida (Köhler, 1967)

Synonyms
- Pseudoleucania perlucida Köhler, 1967

Species of moth

Scania perlucida is a moth of the family Noctuidae. It is found in the Magallanes and Antartica Chilena Region of Chile and Ñorquinco and Río Negro in Argentina.

The wingspan is about 32 mm. Adults are on wing in February.

The larvae feed on Fabaceae species and other magnoliopsida.
