= Pareuxoa parajanae =

Scientific classification
- Kingdom: Animalia
- Phylum: Arthropoda
- Class: Insecta
- Order: Lepidoptera
- Superfamily: Noctuoidea
- Family: Noctuidae
- Genus: Pareuxoa
- Species: P. parajanae

Binomial name
- Pareuxoa parajanae Olivares, 1992

Species of moth

Pareuxoa parajanae is a moth of the family Noctuidae. It is found in the Magallanes and Antartica Chilena Region of Chile.

The wingspan is about 26 mm. Adults are on wing in February.
