= Janaesia antarctica =

Scientific classification
- Domain: Eukaryota
- Kingdom: Animalia
- Phylum: Arthropoda
- Class: Insecta
- Order: Lepidoptera
- Superfamily: Noctuoidea
- Family: Noctuidae
- Genus: Janaesia
- Species: J. antarctica

Binomial name
- Janaesia antarctica (Staudinger, 1899)

Synonyms
- Leucania antarctica Staudinger, 1899; Paranicla hyadesi Köhler, 1959

Species of moth

Janaesia antarctica is a moth of the family Noctuidae. It is found in Punta Arenas in Chile and Tierra del Fuego in Argentina.

The wingspan is 28–38 mm. Adults are on wing from December to February.
