= Magnagrotis oorti =

Scientific classification
- Kingdom: Animalia
- Phylum: Arthropoda
- Class: Insecta
- Order: Lepidoptera
- Superfamily: Noctuoidea
- Family: Noctuidae
- Genus: Magnagrotis
- Species: M. oorti

Binomial name
- Magnagrotis oorti (Köhler, 1945)

Synonyms
- Agrotis oorti Köhler, 1945

Species of moth

Magnagrotis oorti is a moth of the family Noctuidae. It is found in the Maule, Biobío and Aisén Regions of Chile and the Chubut Province of Argentina.

The wingspan is 54.1 mm for males and 58.6 mm for females. Adults are on wing from January to April.
