= Scania tephra =

Scientific classification
- Kingdom: Animalia
- Phylum: Arthropoda
- Class: Insecta
- Order: Lepidoptera
- Superfamily: Noctuoidea
- Family: Noctuidae
- Genus: Scania
- Species: S. tephra

Binomial name
- Scania tephra (Köhler, 1945)

Species of moth

Scania tephra is a moth of the family Noctuidae. It is found in Chile.
