= Peridroma clerica =

Scientific classification
- Domain: Eukaryota
- Kingdom: Animalia
- Phylum: Arthropoda
- Class: Insecta
- Order: Lepidoptera
- Superfamily: Noctuoidea
- Family: Noctuidae
- Genus: Peridroma
- Species: P. clerica

Binomial name
- Peridroma clerica (Butler, 1882)

Synonyms
- Agrotis clerica Butler, 1882; Agrotis carbonifera Mabille, 1885; Agrotis punta-arenae Staudinger, 1899

Species of moth

Peridroma clerica is a moth of the family Noctuidae. It is found from Valparaíso to the Magallanes and Antartica Chilena Region in Chile and Chubut and Neuquén in Argentina.

The wingspan is 40–46 mm. Adults are on wing from August to May.

Larval food plants include beet, tomato and clover.
