= Pseudoleucania onerosa =

Scientific classification
- Domain: Eukaryota
- Kingdom: Animalia
- Phylum: Arthropoda
- Class: Insecta
- Order: Lepidoptera
- Superfamily: Noctuoidea
- Family: Noctuidae
- Genus: Pseudoleucania
- Species: P. onerosa

Binomial name
- Pseudoleucania onerosa (Köhler, 1959)

Synonyms
- Paranicla onerosa Köhler, 1959

Species of moth

Pseudoleucania onerosa is a moth of the family Noctuidae. It is found in the Maule and Biobío Regions of Chile and San Martín de los Andes, Neuquén, Junín de los Andes and Correntoso in Argentina.

The wingspan is 33–40 mm. Adults are on wing from August to March.

The larvae feed on Acanthaceae, Ericaceae and Araliaceae species.
