= Scania simillima =

Scientific classification
- Domain: Eukaryota
- Kingdom: Animalia
- Phylum: Arthropoda
- Class: Insecta
- Order: Lepidoptera
- Superfamily: Noctuoidea
- Family: Noctuidae
- Genus: Scania
- Species: S. simillima

Binomial name
- Scania simillima (Köhler, 1959)

Synonyms
- Paranicla simillima Köhler, 1959

Species of moth

Scania simillima is a moth of the family Noctuidae. It is found in the Magallanes and Antartica Chilena Region of Chile and Neuquén, San Martín de los Andes and Bariloche in Argentina.

The wingspan is 33–35 mm. Adults are on wing from January to February.
