= Atlantagrotis nelida =

Scientific classification
- Kingdom: Animalia
- Phylum: Arthropoda
- Class: Insecta
- Order: Lepidoptera
- Superfamily: Noctuoidea
- Family: Noctuidae
- Genus: Atlantagrotis
- Species: A. nelida

Binomial name
- Atlantagrotis nelida (Köhler, 1945)

Synonyms
- Stenagrotis nelida Köhler, 1945

Species of moth

Atlantagrotis nelida is a moth of the family Noctuidae. It is found in the Maule Region of Chile and the Chubut Province of Argentina.

The wingspan is about 31 mm for males and 32 mm for females. Adults are on wing from January to February in Chile and from October to November in Argentina.
