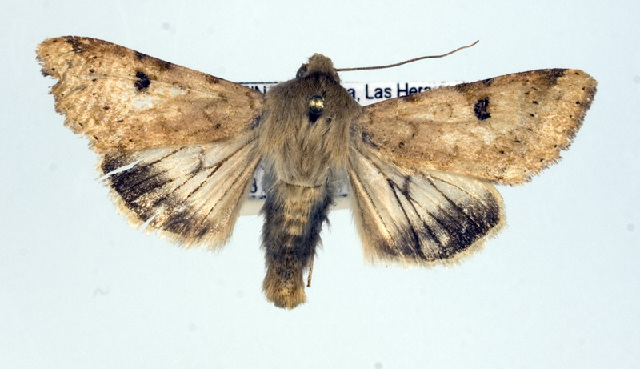

Scientific classification
- Domain: Eukaryota
- Kingdom: Animalia
- Phylum: Arthropoda
- Class: Insecta
- Order: Lepidoptera
- Superfamily: Noctuoidea
- Family: Noctuidae
- Genus: Helicoverpa
- Species: H. atacamae

Binomial name
- Helicoverpa atacamae Hardwick, 1965

Synonyms
- Heliothis atacamae (Hardwick, 1965)

= Helicoverpa atacamae =

Species of moth

Helicoverpa atacamae is a species of moth in the family Noctuidae. It is found in South America, from central Peru to central Chile, and is abundant in the Atacama Desert. Adults are in flight between August and April.
