= Janaesia hibernans =

Scientific classification
- Domain: Eukaryota
- Kingdom: Animalia
- Phylum: Arthropoda
- Class: Insecta
- Order: Lepidoptera
- Superfamily: Noctuoidea
- Family: Noctuidae
- Genus: Janaesia
- Species: J. hibernans

Binomial name
- Janaesia hibernans (Köhler, 1968)

Synonyms
- Eucoptocnemis hibernans Köhler, 1968; Pseudoleucania miraculosa Köhler, 1973; Pseudoleucania monsalvei Angulo, 1981

Species of moth

Janaesia hibernans is a moth of the family Noctuidae. It is found in the Biobío Region of Chile, the Puno Region of Peru and bordering region in Bolivia as well as Neuquén in Argentina.

The wingspan is about 45 mm. Adults are on wing from January to February.
