= Euxoamorpha molibdoida =

Scientific classification
- Domain: Eukaryota
- Kingdom: Animalia
- Phylum: Arthropoda
- Class: Insecta
- Order: Lepidoptera
- Superfamily: Noctuoidea
- Family: Noctuidae
- Genus: Euxoamorpha
- Species: E. molibdoida

Binomial name
- Euxoamorpha molibdoida (Staudinger, 1899)

Synonyms
- Agrotis molibdoida Staudinger, 1899

Species of moth

Euxoamorpha molibdoida is a moth of the family Noctuidae. It is found in the Magallanes and Antartica Chilena Region of Chile and Ushuaia in Argentina.

The wingspan is about 38 mm (1.5 in). Adults are on wing from December to February.
