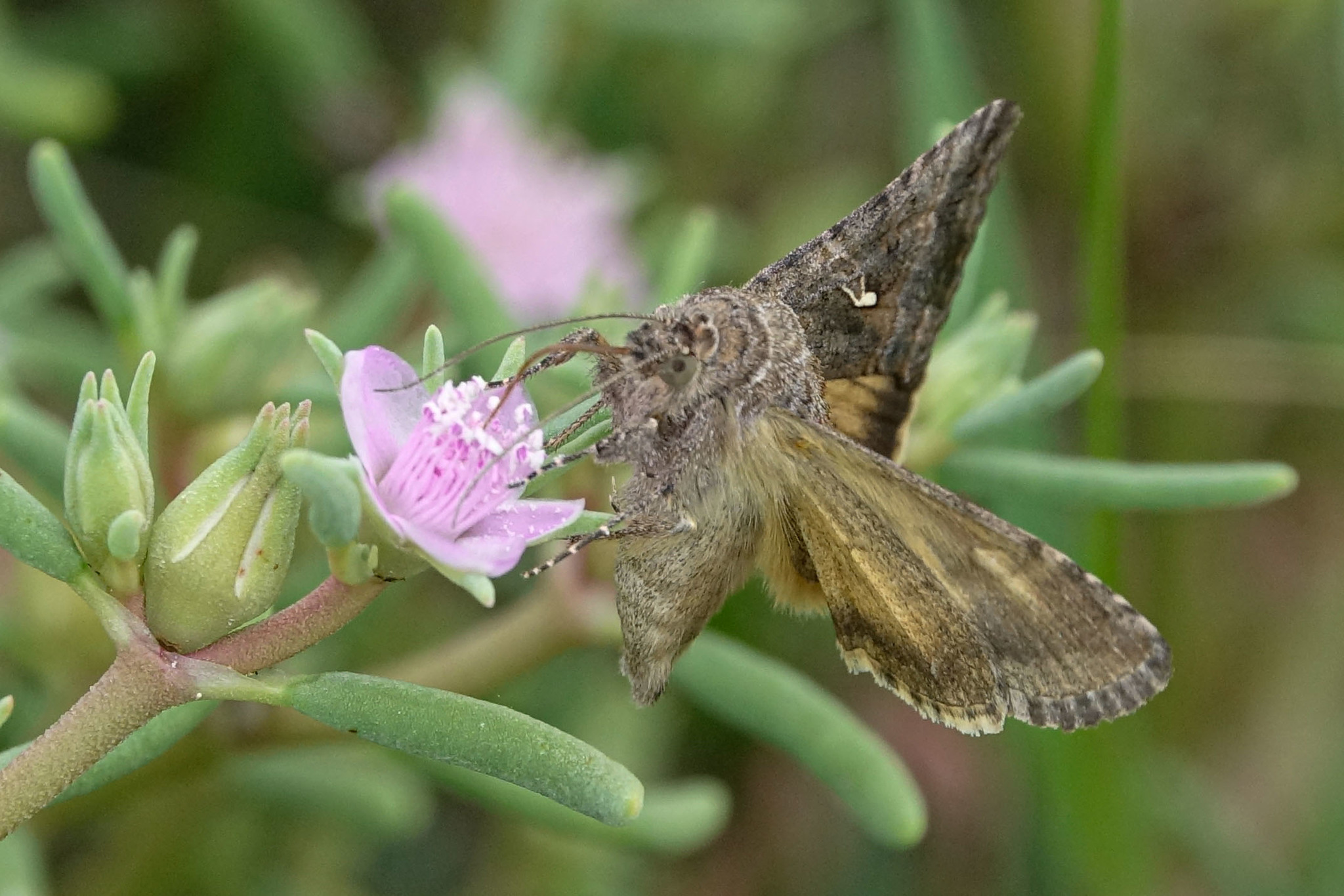

Scientific classification
- Kingdom: Animalia
- Phylum: Arthropoda
- Class: Insecta
- Order: Lepidoptera
- Superfamily: Noctuoidea
- Family: Noctuidae
- Genus: Rachiplusia
- Species: R. nu

Binomial name
- Rachiplusia nu (Guenée, 1852)

Synonyms
- List: Plusia nu Guenée, 1852; Plusia atrata Giacomelli, 1911; Plusia depauperata Blanchard, 1852; Plusia deirusa Walker, 1858; Plusia fumifera Walker, 1858

= Rachiplusia nu =

Species of moth

Rachiplusia nu is a species of moth in the family Noctuidae. It is found in South America, including Paraguay, Uruguay, southern Brazil, Argentina and Chile.

The wingspan is 28–34 mm.

Larvae have been recorded on tobacco, sunflower, soybean, alfalfa, clover, tomato, spinach and number of other plants.
