= Euxoamorpha ingoufii =

Scientific classification
- Domain: Eukaryota
- Kingdom: Animalia
- Phylum: Arthropoda
- Class: Insecta
- Order: Lepidoptera
- Superfamily: Noctuoidea
- Family: Noctuidae
- Genus: Euxoamorpha
- Species: E. ingoufii

Binomial name
- Euxoamorpha ingoufii (Mabille, 1885)

Synonyms
- Agrotis ingoufii Mabille, 1885

Species of moth

Euxoamorpha ingoufii is a moth of the family Noctuidae. It is found in the Magallanes and Antartica Chilena Region of Chile and Santa Cruz in Argentina.

The wingspan is about 33 mm. Adults are on wing from November to February.
