= Beriotisia fueguensis =

Scientific classification
- Kingdom: Animalia
- Phylum: Arthropoda
- Class: Insecta
- Order: Lepidoptera
- Superfamily: Noctuoidea
- Family: Noctuidae
- Genus: Beriotisia
- Species: B. fueguensis

Binomial name
- Beriotisia fueguensis (Hampson, 1907)

Synonyms
- Metalepsis fueguensis Hampson, 1907

Species of moth

Beriotisia fueguensis is a moth of the family Noctuidae. It is found in the Maule and Magallanes regions of Chile and the Neuquén Province of Argentina.

The wingspan is 32–38 mm.
