= Rachiplusia virgula =

Scientific classification
- Kingdom: Animalia
- Phylum: Arthropoda
- Class: Insecta
- Order: Lepidoptera
- Superfamily: Noctuoidea
- Family: Noctuidae
- Genus: Rachiplusia
- Species: R. virgula

Binomial name
- Rachiplusia virgula (Blanchard, 1852)

Synonyms
- List: Plusia virgula Blanchard, 1852; Triphaena signata Philippi, 1860; Syngrapha virgula (Blanchard 1852); Caloplusia virgula (Blanchard 1852); Plusia certa Walker, 1858

Species of moth

Rachiplusia virgula is a species of moth in the family Noctuidae. It is found in Chile.
