= Scania perornata =

Scientific classification
- Domain: Eukaryota
- Kingdom: Animalia
- Phylum: Arthropoda
- Class: Insecta
- Order: Lepidoptera
- Superfamily: Noctuoidea
- Family: Noctuidae
- Genus: Scania
- Species: S. perornata

Binomial name
- Scania perornata (Köhler, 1959)

Synonyms
- Paranicla perornata Köhler, 1959

Species of moth

Scania perornata is a moth of the family Noctuidae. It is found in the Maule and Biobío Regions of Chile and Bariloche, Neuquén and Chapelco in Argentina.

The wingspan is 29–32 mm. Adults are on wing in March.
