= Pareuxoa lineifera =

Scientific classification
- Kingdom: Animalia
- Phylum: Arthropoda
- Class: Insecta
- Order: Lepidoptera
- Superfamily: Noctuoidea
- Family: Noctuidae
- Genus: Pareuxoa
- Species: P. lineifera

Binomial name
- Pareuxoa lineifera (Blanchard, 1852)

Synonyms
- Noctua lineifera Blanchard, 1852

Species of moth

Pareuxoa lineifera is a moth of the family Noctuidae. It is found in Termas de Río Blanco in Chile and Neuquén in Argentina.

The wingspan is 30–32 mm. Adults are on wing in February.
