= Pseudoleucania leucaniiformis =

Scientific classification
- Kingdom: Animalia
- Phylum: Arthropoda
- Clade: Pancrustacea
- Class: Insecta
- Order: Lepidoptera
- Superfamily: Noctuoidea
- Family: Noctuidae
- Genus: Pseudoleucania
- Species: P. leucaniiformis

Binomial name
- Pseudoleucania leucaniiformis (Zerny, 1916)

Synonyms
- Agrotis leucaniiformis Zerny, 1916

Species of moth

Pseudoleucania leucaniiformis is a moth of the family Noctuidae. It is found in the Biobío and Araucanía Regions of Chile, Bolivia and San José and Tucumán in Argentina.

The wingspan is 32–35 mm. Adults are on wing from December to January.
