= Pareuxoa fuscata =

Scientific classification
- Kingdom: Animalia
- Phylum: Arthropoda
- Class: Insecta
- Order: Lepidoptera
- Superfamily: Noctuoidea
- Family: Noctuidae
- Genus: Pareuxoa
- Species: P. fuscata

Binomial name
- Pareuxoa fuscata Angulo & Olivares, 1999

Species of moth

Pareuxoa fuscata is a moth of the family Noctuidae. It is found in the Tarapacá Region of Chile.

The wingspan is about 30 mm. Adults are on wing in November.
