= Noctubourgognea glottuloides =

Scientific classification
- Kingdom: Animalia
- Phylum: Arthropoda
- Class: Insecta
- Order: Lepidoptera
- Superfamily: Noctuoidea
- Family: Noctuidae
- Genus: Noctubourgognea
- Species: N. glottuloides

Binomial name
- Noctubourgognea glottuloides (Butler, 1882)

Synonyms
- Apamea glottuloides Butler, 1882

Species of moth

Noctubourgognea glottuloides is a moth of the family Noctuidae. It is found in Valparaíso in Chile.

The wingspan is 39–41 mm. Adults are on wing from January to March.
