= Scania strigigrapha =

Scientific classification
- Kingdom: Animalia
- Phylum: Arthropoda
- Class: Insecta
- Order: Lepidoptera
- Superfamily: Noctuoidea
- Family: Noctuidae
- Genus: Scania
- Species: S. strigigrapha

Binomial name
- Scania strigigrapha (Hampson, 1905)

Synonyms
- Lycophotia strigigrapha Hampson, 1905

Species of moth

Scania strigigrapha is a moth of the family Noctuidae. It is found in the Coquimbo and Araucanía Regions of Chile.

The wingspan is about 36 mm. Adults are on wing in March.
