= Pareuxoa perdita =

Scientific classification
- Kingdom: Animalia
- Phylum: Arthropoda
- Class: Insecta
- Order: Lepidoptera
- Superfamily: Noctuoidea
- Family: Noctuidae
- Genus: Pareuxoa
- Species: P. perdita

Binomial name
- Pareuxoa perdita (Staudinger, 1889)

Synonyms
- Agrotis perdita Staudinger, 1899

Species of moth

Pareuxoa perdita is a moth of the family Noctuidae. It is found in the Magallanes and Antartica Chilena Region of Chile.

The wingspan is about 32 mm. Adults are on wing from November to January.
