= Peridroma chilenaria =

Scientific classification
- Kingdom: Animalia
- Phylum: Arthropoda
- Class: Insecta
- Order: Lepidoptera
- Superfamily: Noctuoidea
- Family: Noctuidae
- Genus: Peridroma
- Species: P. chilenaria

Binomial name
- Peridroma chilenaria Angulo & Jana-Sáenz, 1984

Species of moth

Peridroma chilenaria is a moth of the family Noctuidae. It is found in Termas de Río Blanco in Chile.

The wingspan is 36–40 mm. Adults are on wing from January to March.
