= Phaenagrotis hecateia =

Scientific classification
- Kingdom: Animalia
- Phylum: Arthropoda
- Class: Insecta
- Order: Lepidoptera
- Superfamily: Noctuoidea
- Family: Noctuidae
- Genus: Phaenagrotis
- Species: P. hecateia

Binomial name
- Phaenagrotis hecateia Köhler, 1953

Species of moth

Phaenagrotis hecateia is a moth of the family Noctuidae. It is found in the Santiago, Valparaíso, Maule and Araucanía Regions of Chile.

The wingspan is 40–45 mm. Adults are on wing from February to May.
