= Noctubourgognea coppingeri =

Scientific classification
- Domain: Eukaryota
- Kingdom: Animalia
- Phylum: Arthropoda
- Class: Insecta
- Order: Lepidoptera
- Superfamily: Noctuoidea
- Family: Noctuidae
- Genus: Noctubourgognea
- Species: N. coppingeri

Binomial name
- Noctubourgognea coppingeri (Butler, 1881)

Synonyms
- Pachnobia coppingeri Butler, 1881

Species of moth

Noctubourgognea coppingeri is a moth of the family Noctuidae. It is found in the Magallanes and Antartica Chilena Region of Chile and Patagonia.

The wingspan is about 40 mm.
