= Pseudoleucania =

Scientific classification
- Domain: Eukaryota
- Kingdom: Animalia
- Phylum: Arthropoda
- Class: Insecta
- Order: Lepidoptera
- Superfamily: Noctuoidea
- Family: Noctuidae
- Subfamily: Noctuinae
- Genus: Pseudoleucania; Staudinger, 1899

Genus of moths

Pseudoleucania is a genus of moths of the family Noctuidae.

== Selected species ==
- Pseudoleucania brosii (Köhler, 1959)
- Pseudoleucania diana (Butler, 1882)
- Pseudoleucania ferruginescens (Blanchard, 1852)
- Pseudoleucania leucaniiformis (Zerny, 1916)
- Pseudoleucania luteomaculata Angulo & Olivares, 2001
- Pseudoleucania marii Köhler, 1979
- Pseudoleucania onerosa (Köhler, 1959)
