= Atlantagrotis aethes =

Scientific classification
- Kingdom: Animalia
- Phylum: Arthropoda
- Class: Insecta
- Order: Lepidoptera
- Superfamily: Noctuoidea
- Family: Noctuidae
- Genus: Atlantagrotis
- Species: A. aethes

Binomial name
- Atlantagrotis aethes (Mabille, 1885)

Synonyms
- Agrotis aethes Mabille, 1885

Species of moth

Atlantagrotis aethes is a moth of the family Noctuidae. It is found in the Magallanes Region of Chile and the Patagonia and Santa Cruz regions of Argentina.

The wingspan is about 34 mm.
