= Scania neuquensis =

Scientific classification
- Domain: Eukaryota
- Kingdom: Animalia
- Phylum: Arthropoda
- Class: Insecta
- Order: Lepidoptera
- Superfamily: Noctuoidea
- Family: Noctuidae
- Genus: Scania
- Species: S. neuquensis

Binomial name
- Scania neuquensis (Köhler, 1959)

Synonyms
- Paranicla neuquensis Köhler, 1959

Species of moth

Scania neuquensis is a moth of the family Noctuidae. It is found in the Maule, Araucanía and Magallanes and Antartica Chilena Regions of Chile and Bariloche, Neuquén and San Martín de los Andes in Argentina.

The wingspan is 32–36 mm. Adults are on wing in February.

The larvae feed on Polipodiidae species.
