= Pseudoleucania marii =

Scientific classification
- Domain: Eukaryota
- Kingdom: Animalia
- Phylum: Arthropoda
- Class: Insecta
- Order: Lepidoptera
- Superfamily: Noctuoidea
- Family: Noctuidae
- Genus: Pseudoleucania
- Species: P. marii

Binomial name
- Pseudoleucania marii Köhler, 1979

Species of moth

Pseudoleucania marii is a moth of the family Noctuidae. It is found in the Maule and Magallanes and Antartica Chilena Regions of Chile and San Martín de los Andes, Copahue and Neuquén in Argentina.

The wingspan is 28–30 mm. Adults are on wing from January to April.
