= Boursinidia darwini =

Scientific classification
- Kingdom: Animalia
- Phylum: Arthropoda
- Class: Insecta
- Order: Lepidoptera
- Superfamily: Noctuoidea
- Family: Noctuidae
- Genus: Boursinidia
- Species: B. darwini

Binomial name
- Boursinidia darwini (Staudinger, 1899)

Synonyms
- Orthosia darwini Staudinger, 1899

Species of moth

Boursinidia darwini is a moth of the family Noctuidae. It is found in Biobío, Araucanía and Magallanes and Antartica Chilena Regions of Chile.

The wingspan is 39–41 mm. Adults are on wing from November to December.
