= Pareuxoa janae =

Scientific classification
- Kingdom: Animalia
- Phylum: Arthropoda
- Class: Insecta
- Order: Lepidoptera
- Superfamily: Noctuoidea
- Family: Noctuidae
- Genus: Pareuxoa
- Species: P. janae

Binomial name
- Pareuxoa janae Angulo, 1990

Species of moth

Pareuxoa janae is a moth of the family Noctuidae. It is found in the Magallanes and Antartica Chilena Region of Chile.

The wingspan is 30–35 mm. Adults are on wing from November to February.
