= Pareuxoa sanctisebastiani =

Scientific classification
- Kingdom: Animalia
- Phylum: Arthropoda
- Class: Insecta
- Order: Lepidoptera
- Superfamily: Noctuoidea
- Family: Noctuidae
- Genus: Pareuxoa
- Species: P. sanctisebastiani

Binomial name
- Pareuxoa sanctisebastiani Köhler, 1954

Synonyms
- Pareuxoa bilineata Köhler, 1954

Species of moth

Pareuxoa sanctisebastiani is a moth of the family Noctuidae. It is found in the Magallanes and Antartica Chilena Region of Chile.

The wingspan is 26–30 mm. Adults are on wing in December.
