= Beriotisia typhlina =

Scientific classification
- Domain: Eukaryota
- Kingdom: Animalia
- Phylum: Arthropoda
- Class: Insecta
- Order: Lepidoptera
- Superfamily: Noctuoidea
- Family: Noctuidae
- Genus: Beriotisia
- Species: B. typhlina

Binomial name
- Beriotisia typhlina (Mabille, 1885)

Synonyms
- Agrotis typhlina Mabille, 1885

Species of moth

Beriotisia typhlina is a moth of the family Noctuidae. It is found in the Magallanes Region in Chile and the Neuquén Province and Tierra del Fuego region in Argentina

The wingspan is about 40 mm. Adults are on wing from January to March.
