= Janaesia exclusiva =

Scientific classification
- Kingdom: Animalia
- Phylum: Arthropoda
- Class: Insecta
- Order: Lepidoptera
- Superfamily: Noctuoidea
- Family: Noctuidae
- Genus: Janaesia
- Species: J. exclusiva

Binomial name
- Janaesia exclusiva Angulo & Olivares, 1999

Species of moth

Janaesia exclusiva is a moth of the family Noctuidae. It is found in the Maule Region of Chile.

The wingspan is 41–45 mm. Adults are on wing from February to March.
