= Beriotisia cuculliformis =

Scientific classification
- Domain: Eukaryota
- Kingdom: Animalia
- Phylum: Arthropoda
- Class: Insecta
- Order: Lepidoptera
- Superfamily: Noctuoidea
- Family: Noctuidae
- Genus: Beriotisia
- Species: B. cuculliformis

Binomial name
- Beriotisia cuculliformis (Köhler, 1945)

Synonyms
- Agrotis cuculliformis Köhler, 1945

Species of moth

Beriotisia cuculliformis is a moth of the family Noctuidae. It is found in the Magallanes Region of Chile and the Chubut Province of Argentina.

The wingspan is 27–37 mm. Adults are on wing in October and February.
