= Pareuxoa meditata =

Scientific classification
- Domain: Eukaryota
- Kingdom: Animalia
- Phylum: Arthropoda
- Class: Insecta
- Order: Lepidoptera
- Superfamily: Noctuoidea
- Family: Noctuidae
- Genus: Pareuxoa
- Species: P. meditata

Binomial name
- Pareuxoa meditata Köhler, 1967

Species of moth

Pareuxoa meditata is a moth of the family Noctuidae. It is found in the Magallanes and Antartica Chilena Region of Chile and Neuquén in Argentina.

The wingspan is 35–36 mm. Adults are on wing from November to January.
