= Pseudoleucania ferruginescens =

Scientific classification
- Domain: Eukaryota
- Kingdom: Animalia
- Phylum: Arthropoda
- Class: Insecta
- Order: Lepidoptera
- Superfamily: Noctuoidea
- Family: Noctuidae
- Genus: Pseudoleucania
- Species: P. ferruginescens

Binomial name
- Pseudoleucania ferruginescens (Blanchard, 1852)

Synonyms
- Cerastis ferruginescens Blanchard, 1852; Agrotis pesronii Guenée, 1852; Agrotis anteposita Guenée, 1852; Cerastis minna Butler, 1882; Orthosia mollis Mabille, 1885

Species of moth

Pseudoleucania ferruginescens is a moth of the family Noctuidae. It is found in Santiago, Valparaíso, Patagonia, Estrecho de Magallanes, Córdoba, La Rioja, Buenos Aires, Tandil, Balcarce, Río Negro, Comodoro Rivadavia, Esquel, Neuquén, Mendoza and Catamarca in Argentina.

The wingspan is about 34 mm (1.3 in). Adults are on wing in December.
