= Pareuxoa flavicosta =

Scientific classification
- Kingdom: Animalia
- Phylum: Arthropoda
- Class: Insecta
- Order: Lepidoptera
- Superfamily: Noctuoidea
- Family: Noctuidae
- Genus: Pareuxoa
- Species: P. flavicosta

Binomial name
- Pareuxoa flavicosta (Wallengren, 1860)

Synonyms
- Noctua flavicosta Wallengren, 1860; Agrotis xanthostola Mabille, 1885; Ochropleura magellanica Butler, 1881; Agrotis dalei Butler, 1885; Episilia ochricraspia Hampson, 1911

Species of moth

Pareuxoa flavicosta is a moth of the family Noctuidae. It is found in Puerto Natales, Tres Puentes, Temuco and Termas de Río Blanco in Chile and Neuquén, Chapelco and San Martín de los Andes in Argentina.

The wingspan is about 35 mm. Adults are on wing from January to April.
