= Beriotisia taniae =

Scientific classification
- Kingdom: Animalia
- Phylum: Arthropoda
- Class: Insecta
- Order: Lepidoptera
- Superfamily: Noctuoidea
- Family: Noctuidae
- Genus: Beriotisia
- Species: B. taniae

Binomial name
- Beriotisia taniae Angulo & Olivares, 1999

Species of moth

Beriotisia taniae is a moth of the family Noctuidae. It is only known from the Maule Region in Chile.

The wingspan is about 35 mm. Adults are on wing in January.
