= Pareuxoa nigrolineata =

Scientific classification
- Kingdom: Animalia
- Phylum: Arthropoda
- Class: Insecta
- Order: Lepidoptera
- Superfamily: Noctuoidea
- Family: Noctuidae
- Genus: Pareuxoa
- Species: P. nigrolineata

Binomial name
- Pareuxoa nigrolineata (Jana-Sáenz, 1989)

Synonyms
- Caphornia nigrolineata Jana-Sáenz, 1989

Species of moth

Pareuxoa nigrolineata is a moth of the family Noctuidae. It is found in the Los Lagos and Aisén Regions of Chile.

The wingspan is 40–45 mm. Adults are on wing from October to January.
