= Scania messia =

Scientific classification
- Kingdom: Animalia
- Phylum: Arthropoda
- Class: Insecta
- Order: Lepidoptera
- Superfamily: Noctuoidea
- Family: Noctuidae
- Genus: Scania
- Species: S. messia

Binomial name
- Scania messia (Guenée, 1852)

Synonyms
- Agrotis messium Guenée, 1852; Agrotis personii Guenée, 1852; Agrotis furcifera Walker, 1858; Agrotis digramma Mabille, 1885; Pseudoleucania messium (Guenée, 1852); Anicla messium

Species of moth

Scania messia is a moth of the family Noctuidae. It is found from the Valparaíso to the Los Lagos Region of Chile, Buenos Aires, Tandil, La Rioja and Santa Fe in Argentina and Colonia, Estanzuela, Puntas Arcual, Montevideo and Paysandú in Uruguay.

The wingspan is about 31.6 mm. Adults are on wing from August to April.

The larvae feed on various agricultural crops, as well as Fagaceae species and Brassica nigra.
