= Pareuxoa luteicosta =

Scientific classification
- Kingdom: Animalia
- Phylum: Arthropoda
- Class: Insecta
- Order: Lepidoptera
- Superfamily: Noctuoidea
- Family: Noctuidae
- Genus: Pareuxoa
- Species: P. luteicosta

Binomial name
- Pareuxoa luteicosta Angulo & Olivares, 1999

Species of moth

Pareuxoa luteicosta is a moth of the family Noctuidae. It is found in the Maule Region of Chile.

The wingspan is about 32 mm. Adults are on wing from January to March.
