= Boursinidia =

Scientific classification
- Kingdom: Animalia
- Phylum: Arthropoda
- Class: Insecta
- Order: Lepidoptera
- Superfamily: Noctuoidea
- Family: Noctuidae
- Subfamily: Noctuinae
- Genus: Boursinidia; Köhler, 1953

Type species
- Boursinidia petrowskyi Köhler, 1953.

Genus of moths

Boursinidia is a genus of moths of the family Noctuidae. The genus name honours Charles Boursin, who worked extensively on the family Noctuidae. The type species is Boursinidia petrowskyi Köhler, 1953. It is the type genus for the tribe, Boursinidiini.

== Selected species ==
- Boursinidia atrimedia (Hampson, 1907)
- Boursinidia darwini (Staudinger, 1899)
