= Scania odontoclasper =

Scientific classification
- Kingdom: Animalia
- Phylum: Arthropoda
- Class: Insecta
- Order: Lepidoptera
- Superfamily: Noctuoidea
- Family: Noctuidae
- Genus: Scania
- Species: S. odontoclasper

Binomial name
- Scania odontoclasper Olivares, 1994

Species of moth

Scania odontoclasper is a moth of the family Noctuidae. It is found in the Maule, Araucanía and Los Lagos Regions of Chile.

The wingspan is about 34 mm. Adults are on wing from January to February.
