= Boursinidia atrimedia =

Scientific classification
- Kingdom: Animalia
- Phylum: Arthropoda
- Class: Insecta
- Order: Lepidoptera
- Superfamily: Noctuoidea
- Family: Noctuidae
- Genus: Boursinidia
- Species: B. atrimedia

Binomial name
- Boursinidia atrimedia (Hampson, 1907)

Synonyms
- Lycophotia atrimedia Hampson, 1907; Boursinidia schachowskoyi Köhler, 1953

Species of moth

Boursinidia atrimedia is a moth of the family Noctuidae. It is found in Chile (Tierra del Fuego, Rio Mc Clelland, Chaitén, Punta Arenas and Ojo Bueno) and Argentina (Nahuel Huapi, San Martín de los Andes and Bariloche).

The wingspan is about 42 mm. Adults are on wing from November to December.
