= Altus Lacy Quaintance =

American naturalist (1870–1958)

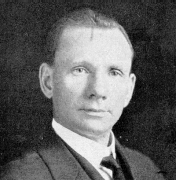
- Altus Lacy Quaintance c. 1900
- Born: December 19, 1870; New Sharon, Iowa
- Died: August 7, 1958 (aged 87); Silver Spring, Maryland
- Occupation: Entomologist
- Known for: Authority on Whitefly

Altus Lacy Quaintance (December 19, 1870 – August 7, 1958) was an American entomologist who specialized in the study of insect pests of fruit trees. He was recognized as an expert on Aleyrodidae, a family of white flies that are major pests of citrus and greenhouse plants.

== Biography ==
Quaintance was born December 19, 1870, in New Sharon, Iowa. He received a Bachelor of Science at the Florida Agricultural College at the University of Florida in 1893, a Master of Science from the Alabama Polytechnic Institute in 1894 and at the same location, a Doctor of Sciences in 1915.

From 1894 to 1902, Quaintance taught biology and entomology at the University of Florida, served as an entomologist at the agricultural experimental station of Georgia, and then worked as an entomologist at the University of Maryland. In 1903, he was hired at the US Bureau of Entomology and later became entomologist in charge of the new Division of Deciduous Fruit Insect Investigations, responsible for research on insect pests of fruit trees, a function that he retained until his retirement in 1930.

After his retirement, Quaintance settled on his farm, called "Quaint Acres", in 1940 in Maryland where he propagated fruit and ornamental nursery stock. In May 1945, a B-25 bomber crashed there. He died at his home near Silver Spring, Maryland, on August 7, 1958.

Quaintance was a charter member of the Entomological Society of America, served as president of the Entomological Society of Washington, and was elected president of the American Association of Economic Entomologists in 1904.

== Partial list of publications ==
- With William Moore Scott Spraying peaches for the control of brown-rot, scab, and curculio (U.S. Dept. of Agriculture, 1911).
- Contributions toward monograph of American Aleurodidae; Red spiders of U.S. (Tetranychus and Stigmaeus) (1900).
- With Arthur Challen Baker (1875–1959) Control of aphids injurious to orchard fruits, currant, gooseberry and grape (1920).
- Cotton bollworm (1903–1904).
- Fumigation of apples for San Jose scale (1909).
