= Janaesia carnea =

Scientific classification
- Domain: Eukaryota
- Kingdom: Animalia
- Phylum: Arthropoda
- Class: Insecta
- Order: Lepidoptera
- Superfamily: Noctuoidea
- Family: Noctuidae
- Genus: Janaesia
- Species: J. carnea

Binomial name
- Janaesia carnea (Druce, 1903)

Synonyms
- Richia carnea Druce, 1903

Species of moth

Janaesia carnea is a moth of the family Noctuidae. It is found in the Santiago, Biobío and Araucanía Regions of Chile and San Martín de los Andes and Neuquén in Argentina.

The wingspan is 40–45 mm. Adults are on wing from February to April.
