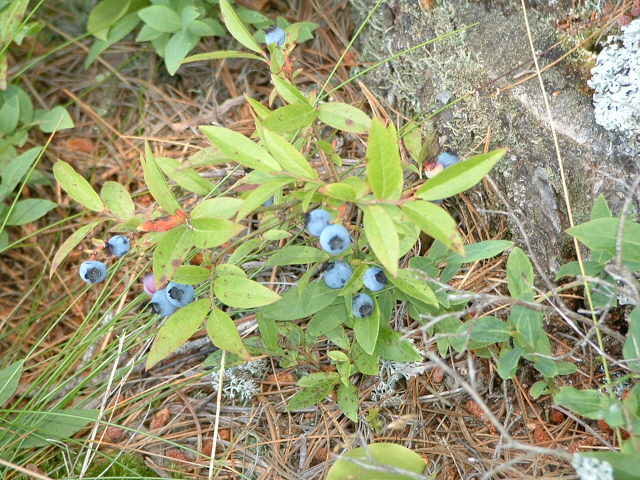
- Pancake Bay Provincial Park, Ontario

Scientific classification
- Kingdom: Plantae
- Clade: Embryophytes
- Clade: Tracheophytes
- Clade: Spermatophytes
- Clade: Angiosperms
- Clade: Eudicots
- Clade: Asterids
- Order: Ericales
- Family: Ericaceae
- Genus: Vaccinium
- Section: Vaccinium sect. Cyanococcus
- Species: V. angustifolium

Binomial name
- Vaccinium angustifolium Aiton 1789 not Benth. 1840

Synonyms
- Cyanococcus angustifolium (Aiton) Rydb.; Vaccinium nigrum (Alph. Wood) Britton

= Vaccinium angustifolium =

Lowbush blueberry

Berry and plant

Vaccinium angustifolium, commonly known as the wild lowbush blueberry and the low sweet berry is a species of blueberry native to eastern and central Canada, Great Lakes and the northeastern United States.

== Description ==
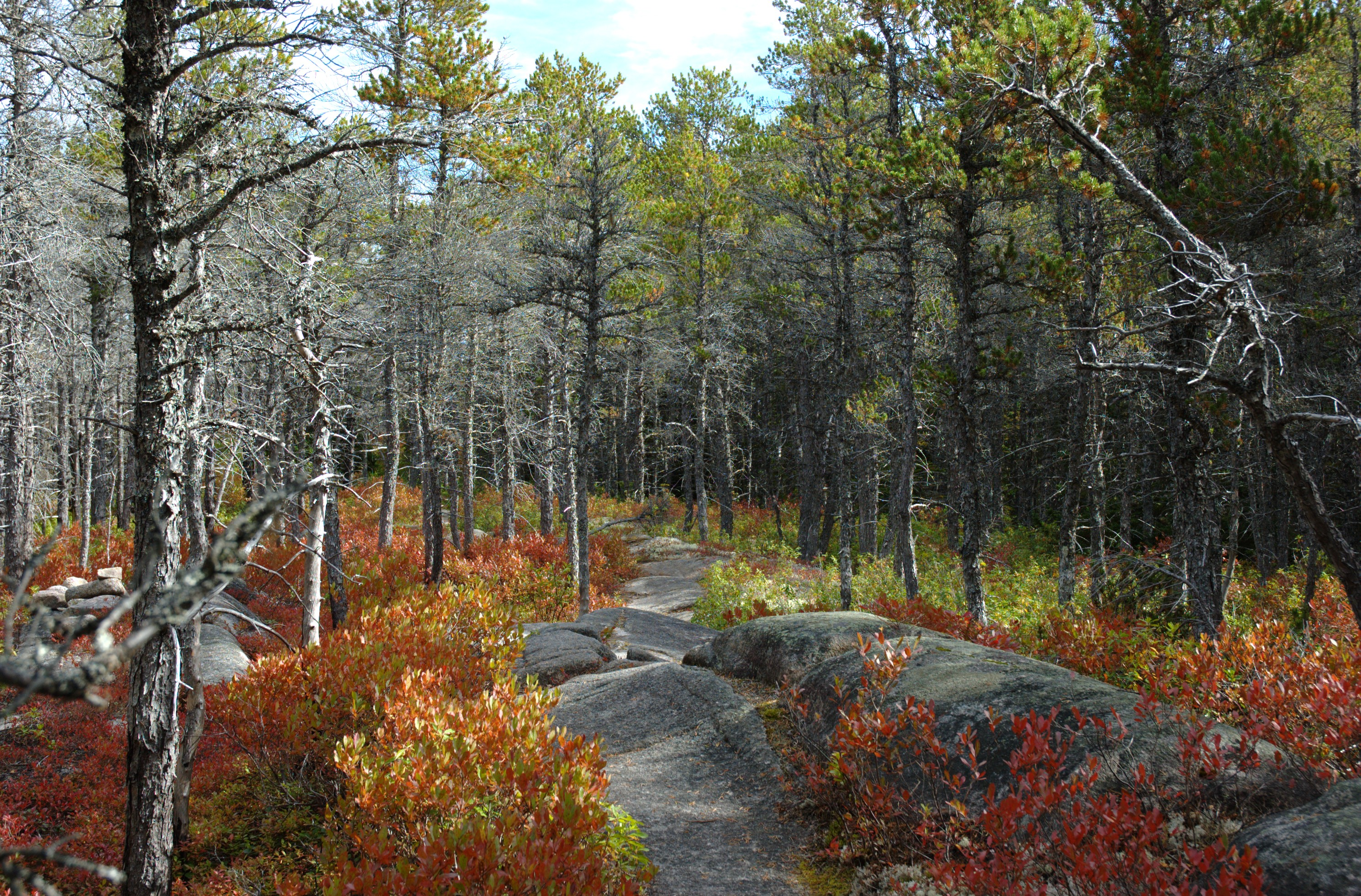
V. angustifolium growing in a forest of another fire-adapted species, Pinus banksiana

Vaccinium angustifolium is a low spreading deciduous shrub growing 5 to 60 centimetres (2 to 23 1/2 in) tall. Its rhizomes can lie dormant up to 100 years, sprouting when given the adequate amount of sunlight, soil moisture, and oxygen content. The leaves are glossy blue-green in summer, turning a variety of reds in the fall. The leaf shape is broad to elliptical, with the buds brownish red in stem axils.

The flowers are white or pink, bell-shaped, 4 to 6 millimetres (1/8 to 1/4 in) long. The fruit is a small sweet dark blue to black berry, full of antioxidants and flavonoids.

Several buds may be on a healthy stem, and each bud can open up and have several blossoms. A blueberry field that has full plant coverage can have as many as 150 million blossoms per acre.

Chromosome number is 2n = 48.

== Etymology ==
The species epithet angustifolium is a combination of the Latin words angustum meaning 'narrow', and folium meaning 'leaf'.

== Distribution and habitat ==
The lowbush blueberry is native to central and eastern Canada (from Manitoba to Newfoundland) as well as north-central and eastern United States (growing as far south as the Great Smoky Mountains and west to the Great Lakes region). In its native habitat the plant grows in open conifer woods, old fields, and sandy or rocky balds.

Glacier ice from the Ice Age sculpted the Maine landscape and is responsible for creating some of the most productive V. angustifolium habitats. The species is fire-tolerant, and its numbers often increase in an area following a forest fire.

This plant grows best in wooded areas, old abandoned farmyards or open areas with well-drained acidic soils. In some areas it produces natural blueberry barrens, where it is practically the only species covering large areas.

== Ecology ==
Many animals feed on the fruit and foliage of the lowbush berry, some of which include black bears, raccoons, foxes, white-tailed deer and birds.

Its leaves are also popular among caterpillars. It is a larval host to the pale tiger moth, the peppered moth, the chain-dotted geometer, the saw-wing moth, the blueberry gray moth, the mousy angle moth, Caloptilia vacciniella, Andromeda underwing, the shadowy arches, the two-spot dart, the dingy cutworm moth, the speckled cutworm, the decorated owlet, the pirate looper, Norman's dart, the gray swordgrass moth, the pink-edged sulphur butterfly, the pawpaw sphinx moth, and the blueberry leaftier moth.

== Cultivation ==
Vaccinium angustifolium has a two-year production cycle. The first year is known as the vegetative year and the second is known as the fruit-bearing year.

In order to be productive each year, most farmers divide their land to have half their crop in the vegetative year while the other half is in the fruit-bearing year.

Traditionally, blueberry growers burn their fields every few years to eliminate shrubs and fertilize the soil. In Acadian French, a blueberry field is known as a brûlis (from brûlé 'burnt') because of that technique, which is still in use.

=== Pruning ===
Native Americans regularly burned away trees and shrubs in parts of eastern Maine to stimulate blueberry production. Modern farmers use various methods of burning or mowing to accomplish this. There are several methods growers use to stimulate blueberry production on their land, such as burning the land or using a flail mower, brush hog, lawnmower, etc. to cut the plants off as close to the ground as possible without scalping the land. These procedures are used to promote the spreading of rhizomes under the soil. Some growers use a sickle mower in the fall after the crop has been harvested to mow the plants off, leaving about 1–2 inches of stem so the growers can burn the remainder of the plants in the spring, using less fuel for the fire.

Farmers then treat their crops with pesticides to control weeds and insects. The fields are then left for new growth to emerge, develop, and flourish for the remainder of the year.

=== Pollination ===
During the harvest or fruit bearing year, blueberry growers rent honey bee hives to put in their fields for pollination. These hives are placed in the fields at a density range of anywhere from 1–8 hives per acre. The hives are placed in the fields at 10–20% bloom allowing the bees to have enough forage rather than going elsewhere to forage. Hives are left in blueberry fields for 2 weeks on average, allowing the bees to pollinate the variety of clones in the field, all of which bloom at different times during the two-week period.

Some growers also use bumblebees as well in ambitions of maximum pollination. Bumblebees will fly in colder and wetter weather conditions than the honey bee will, and they also pollinate in a different way than the honey bee. Bumblebees can sonicate the flowers, which releases pollen from deep inside the poricidal anthers. This is known as buzz pollination.

Blueberry growers also rely on many wild bees for pollination, including solitary bees like Andrena carlini and Colletes inaequalis.

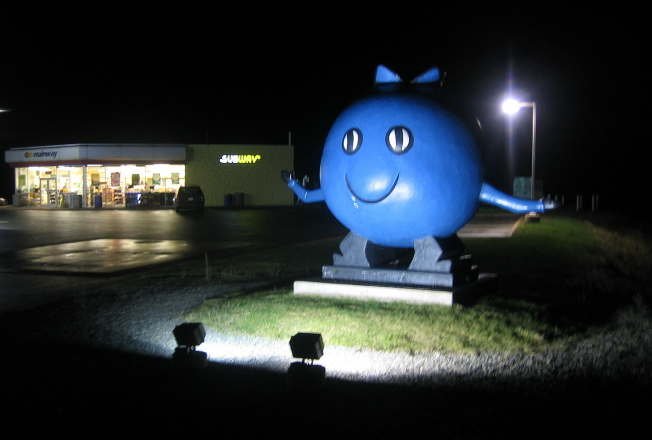
Giant blueberry person in Nova Scotia

== In culture ==
The wild lowbush blueberry is the Nova Scotian Provincial Berry. Oxford, Nova Scotia, is nicknamed the "Wild Blueberry Capital of Canada".

It is also the state fruit of Maine. Maine's state dessert is blueberry pie made with wild blueberries.
