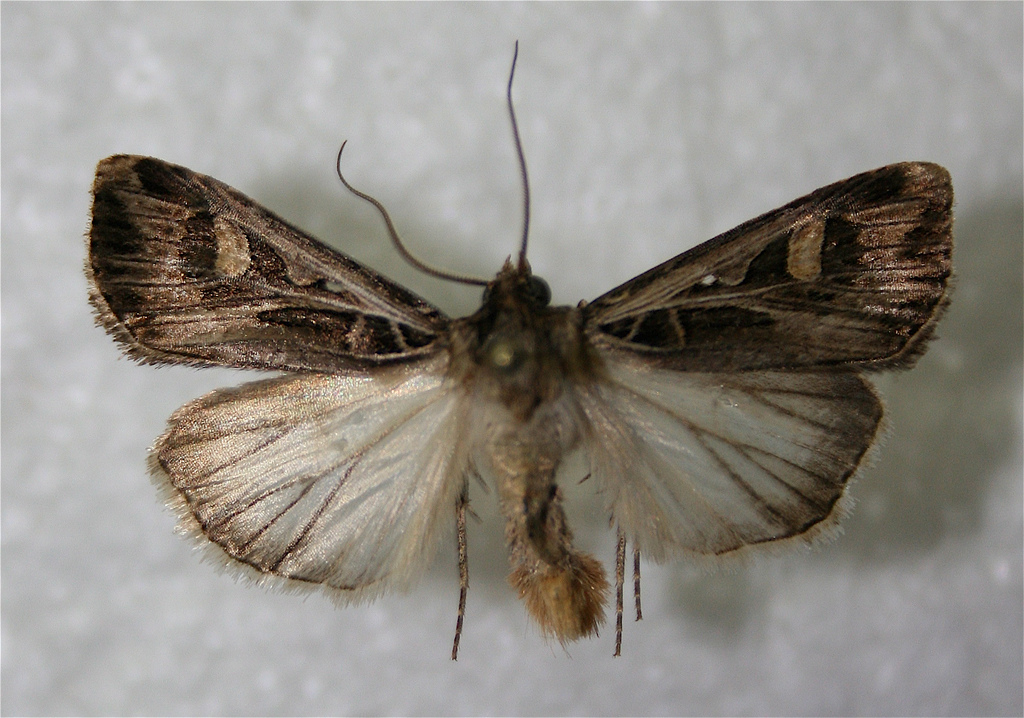

Scientific classification
- Domain: Eukaryota
- Kingdom: Animalia
- Phylum: Arthropoda
- Class: Insecta
- Order: Lepidoptera
- Superfamily: Noctuoidea
- Family: Noctuidae
- Genus: Feltia
- Species: F. jaculifera

Binomial name
- Feltia jaculifera (Guenée, 1852)

Synonyms
- Feltia ducens; Feltia edentata J.B. Smith, 1902; Feltia hudsoni J.B. Smith, 1903

= Feltia jaculifera =

Dingy cutworm

Species of moth

Feltia jaculifera, the dingy cutworm, is a moth of the family Noctuidae and is common throughout North America. There are three other species of Feltia that are often confused for F. jaculifera and they are F. herilis, F. subgothica and F. tricosa.

== Identification ==
=== Adult ===
An adults wingspan is 30 to 40mm in length. The forewing is dark gray to black with a white, gray and tan pattern of streaks. The M3 and CU1 veins have white-lines that extend from the bottom corner to the outer margin. These lines form a distinctive W-shape where they meet the subterminal line.

=== Larvae ===
The caterpillars of this species have a light gray dorsal surface and have four black dots on the dorsal surface of each abdominal segment. The ventral surface is pale yellow. The larvae feed upon more than forty different species of plants including but not limited to; alfalfa, aster, blueberry, chickweed, clover, corn, dock, flax, goldenrod, miscellaneous garden vegetables, grasses, mullein, oats, raspberry, rye, tobacco, and wheat.

== Life cycle ==
Adults are seen flying from July to November and the larvae overwinter and emerge in the spring. They can be seen flying in many areas including fields, gardens, waste areas. Adults are nocturnal and often come to lights. In more arid areas adults can be found nectaring and resting on composite flowers in the late afternoon. Females will oviposit in flower heads, particularly in the heads of Asteraceae.
