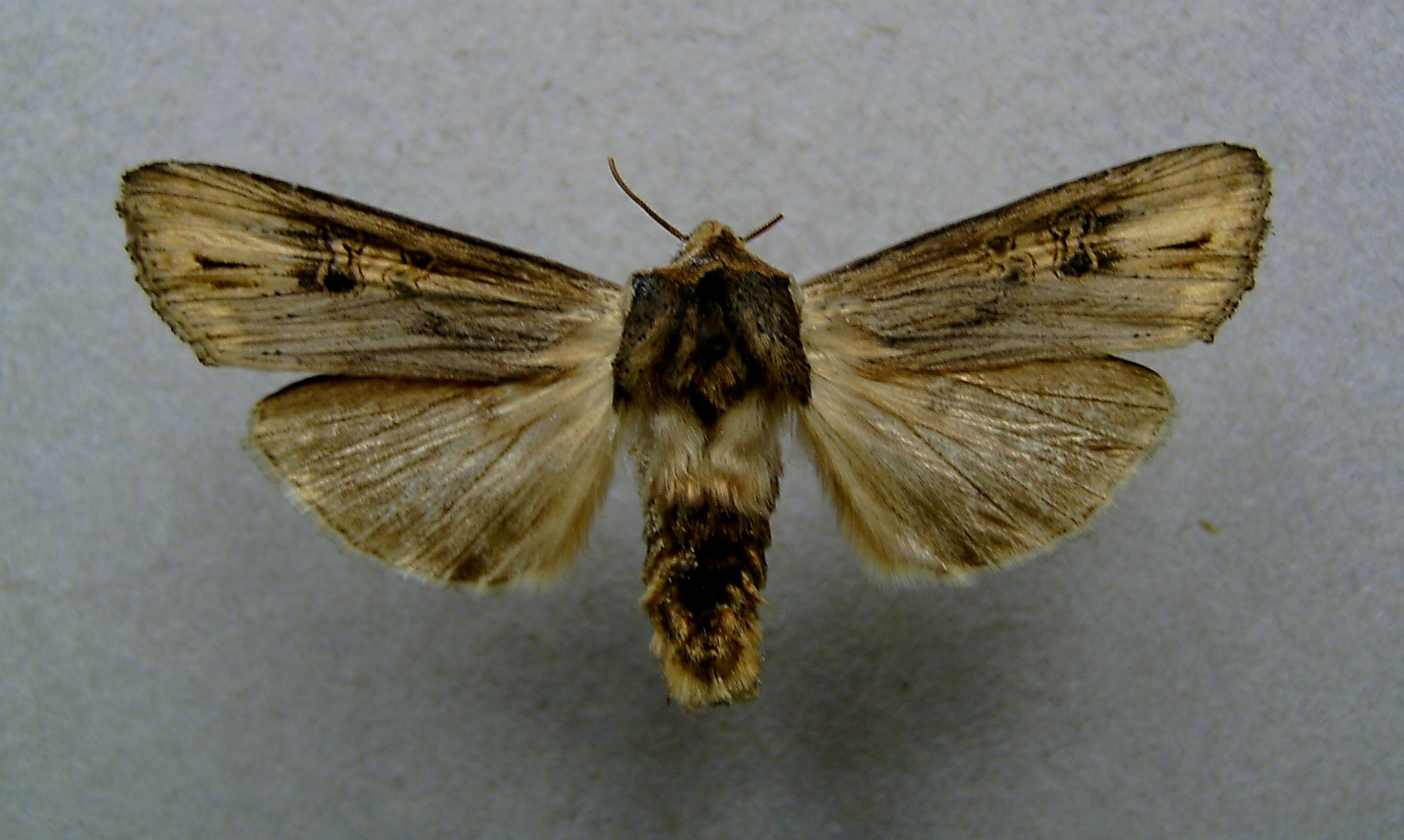
- Mounted adult specimen
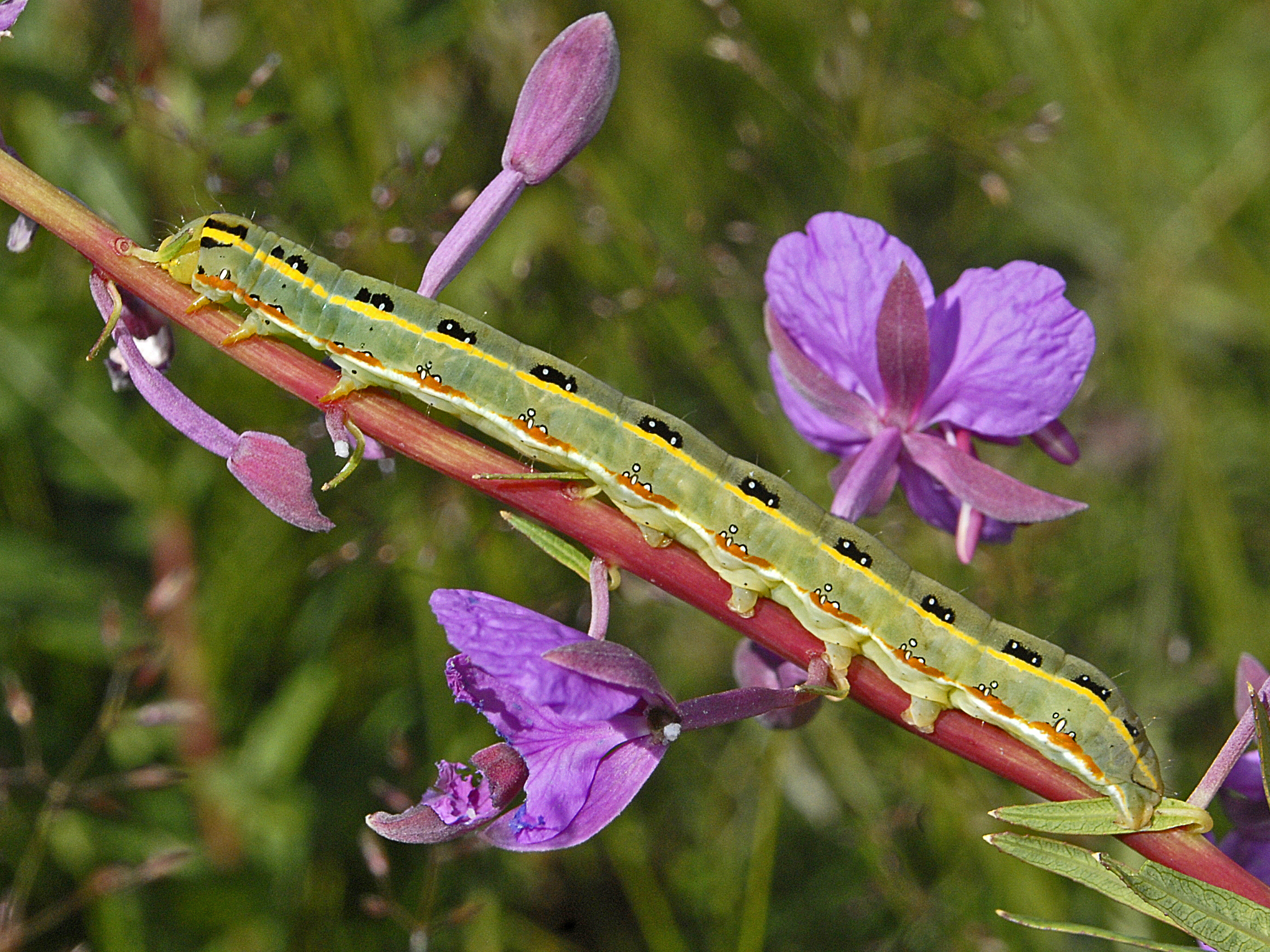
- Caterpillar

Scientific classification
- Kingdom: Animalia
- Phylum: Arthropoda
- Class: Insecta
- Order: Lepidoptera
- Superfamily: Noctuoidea
- Family: Noctuidae
- Genus: Xylena
- Species: X. exsoleta

Binomial name
- Xylena exsoleta (Linnaeus, 1758)

= Xylena exsoleta =

Species of moth

Xylena exsoleta, the sword-grass, is a species of moth of the family Noctuidae.

== Technical description and variation ==
The wingspan is 58–68 mm. The length of the forewings is 24–29 mm. Forewing long and narrow. Differs from Xylena vetusta in being mainly dark or blackish grey, the ochreous ground showing only in a longitudinal streak above the median vein broadening along vein 5; orbicular stigma large and well-marked, with black linear centre and outline; lines marked by pairs of black spots on veins; submarginal line preceded by two wedgeshaped black marks which do not reach the reniform; hindwing dark fuscous. Co-extensive in range with vetusta; the form occurring in Central Asia is differentiated by Staudinger as ab. impudica, the ground colour being paler, more ashy grey, with less distinct markings; in ab. obscurata Spul. the whole forewing is suffused with brown; the opposite to this, in which all the black grey shading is absent and the whole forewing, except narrowly along costa, is pearly grey, may be called ab. pallescens ab. nov. [Warren]; in this the markings are as distinct as in the type form, and the hindwing is quite pale fuscous; there are 4 males of this form in the Tring Museum from Europe, one marked Crimmitschau and the other 3 without more precise locality.

== Biology ==
The moth flies from September to July depending on the location.

Larva green; dorsal and subdorsal lines broadly yellow; spiracular line red, pale-edged beneath, with the yellow spiracles above it; tubercles white with broad blackish rings. The larvae are widely polyphagous, feeding on various deciduous trees, shrubs and herbaceous plants, including Epilobium, Lilium, Iris, Rumex, Euphorbia, Ononis, Allium cepa, Brassica oleracea and Delphinium. The caterpillars of sword-grass can reach a length of approximately 60 mm. They are green, with black blotches, white lateral lines and orange markings. Like many similar species, they make their metamorphosis underground.

== Distribution ==
It is found from the Canary Islands and north-western Africa through Europe, the Near East and central Asia up to the Pacific and Japan.

== Habitat ==
These moths prefer moorlands and woodlands.

== Gallery ==
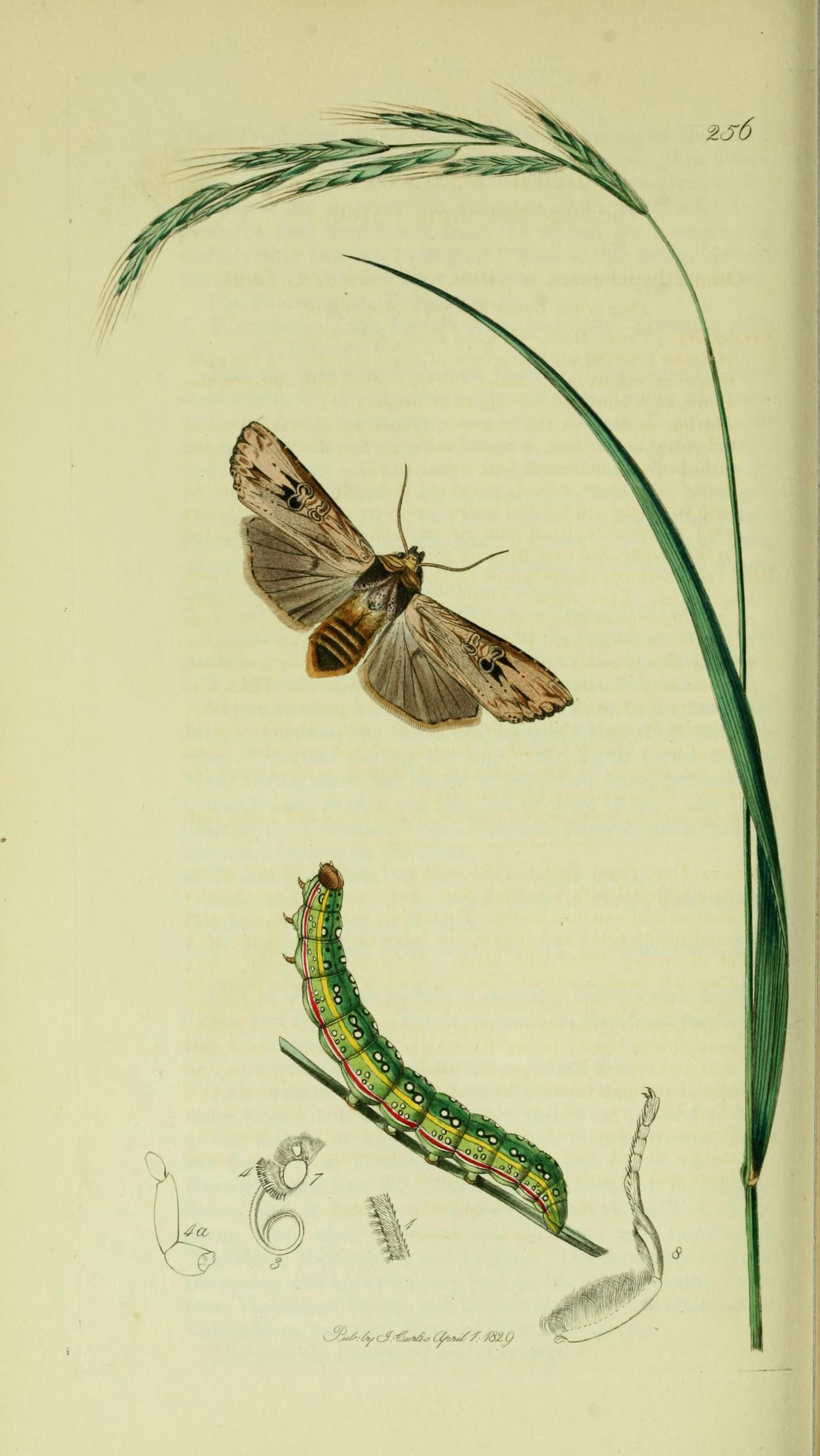
Illustration from John Curtis's British Entomology Volume 5

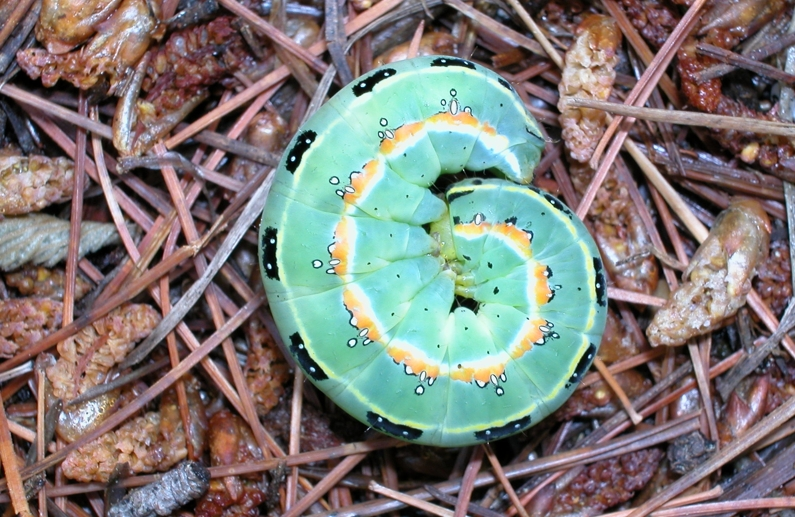
Caterpillar
