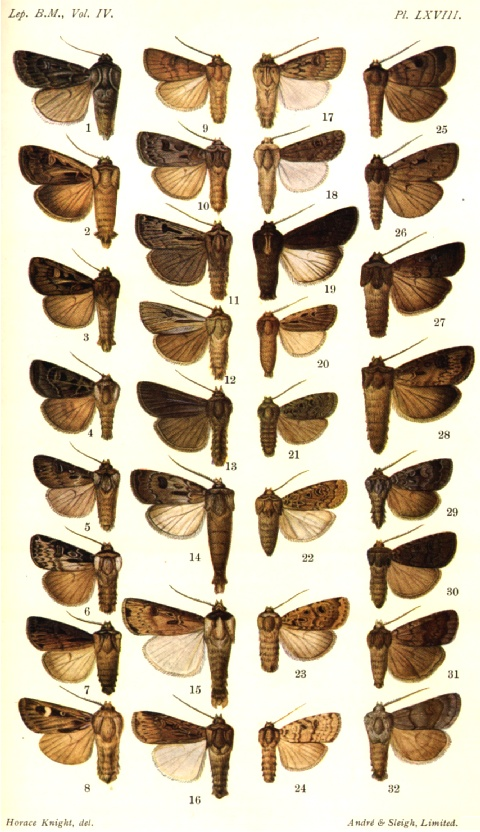

Scientific classification
- Kingdom: Animalia
- Phylum: Arthropoda
- Class: Insecta
- Order: Lepidoptera
- Superfamily: Noctuoidea
- Family: Noctuidae
- Subfamily: Noctuinae
- Genus: Trichosilia; Hampson, 1918

= Trichosilia =

Genus of moths

Trichosilia was a genus of moths of the family Noctuidae, it is now considered a subgenus of Feltia.

== Former species ==
- Trichosilia acarnea (Smith, 1905)
