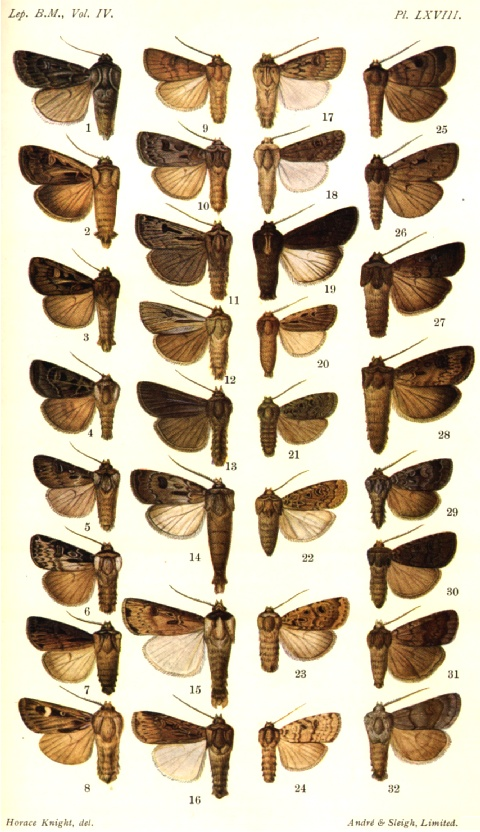
- 29. A. geniculata, m. p. 370. Massachusetts. H10680 Feltia geniculata (G. & R., 1868)

Scientific classification
- Domain: Eukaryota
- Kingdom: Animalia
- Phylum: Arthropoda
- Class: Insecta
- Order: Lepidoptera
- Superfamily: Noctuoidea
- Family: Noctuidae
- Genus: Feltia
- Species: F. geniculata

Binomial name
- Feltia geniculata Grote & Robinson, 1868

Synonyms
- Trichosilia geniculata (Grote & Robinson, 1868)

= Feltia geniculata =

Species of moth

Feltia geniculata, the knee-joint dart, is a moth of the family Noctuidae. It is found in Ontario, Quebec, New Brunswick, Nova Scotia, Prince Edward Island and Manitoba and adjacent parts of the United States, including Massachusetts.

The wingspan is 29–34 mm. Adults are on wing from July to mid-September.

The larvae feed on a wide variety of plants.
