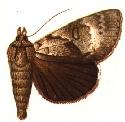

Scientific classification
- Kingdom: Animalia
- Phylum: Arthropoda
- Class: Insecta
- Order: Lepidoptera
- Superfamily: Noctuoidea
- Family: Erebidae
- Genus: Catocala
- Species: C. andromedae

Binomial name
- Catocala andromedae (Guenée, 1852)

Synonyms
- Hypogramma andromedae Guenée, 1852; Catocala tristis W. H. Edwards, 1864

= Catocala andromedae =

Species of moth

Catocala andromedae, the Andromeda underwing or gloomy underwing, is a moth of the family Erebidae. The species was first described by Achille Guenée in 1852. It is found in the United States from Maine south through New Jersey to Florida and Alabama and west to Texas and Oklahoma.

The wingspan is 40–50 mm. Adults are on wing from May to August depending on the location. There is probably one generation per year.

The larvae feed on Andromeda, Carya, Lyonia, Quercus, Vaccinium angustifolium and Vaccinium corymbosum.
