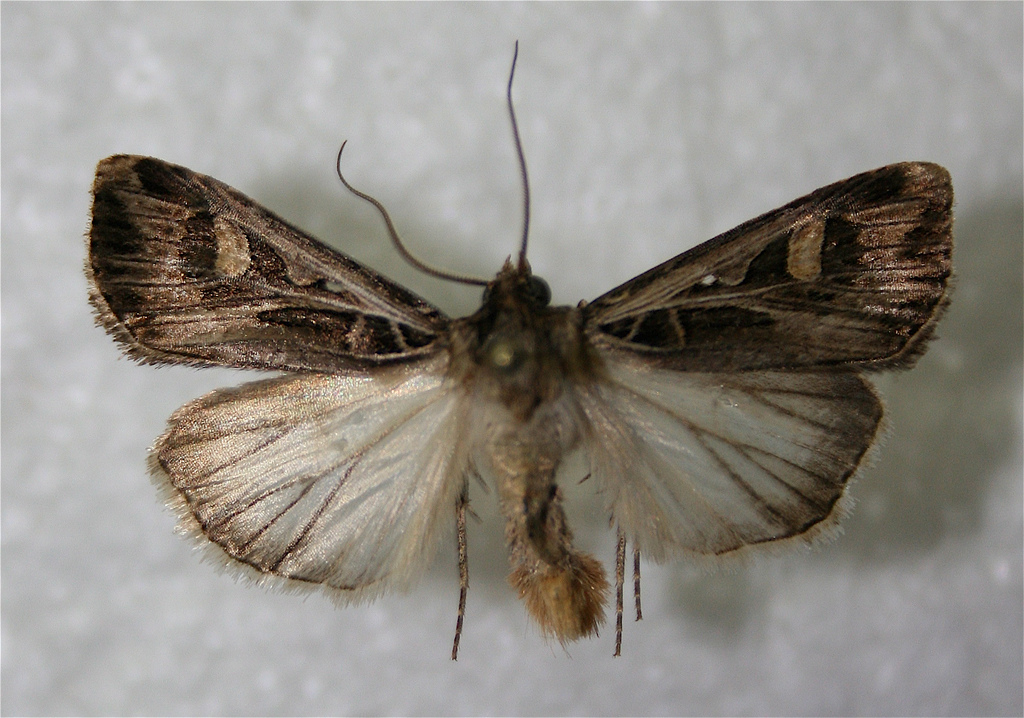
- Feltia jaculifera

Scientific classification
- Kingdom: Animalia
- Phylum: Arthropoda
- Class: Insecta
- Order: Lepidoptera
- Superfamily: Noctuoidea
- Family: Noctuidae
- Subtribe: Agrotina
- Genus: Feltia; Walker, 1856

Synonyms
- Trichosilia

= Feltia =

Genus of moths

Feltia is a genus of moths of the family Noctuidae.

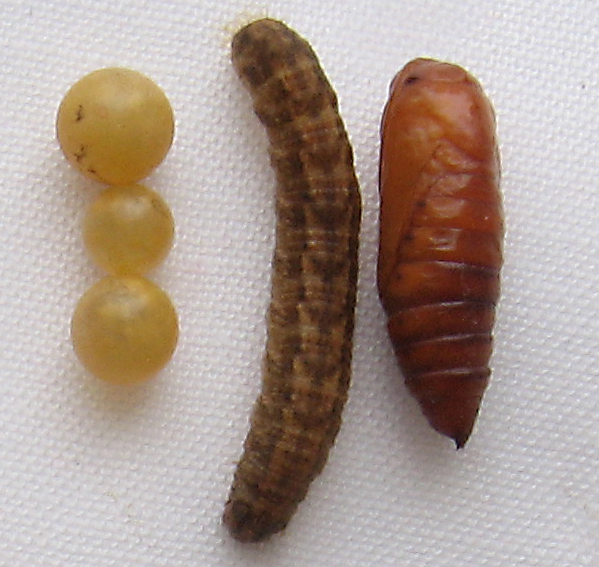
Larval and pupal stage of a Feltia species next to what appears to be osmocote plant fertilizer

== Species ==
- Feltia austrina (Lafontaine, 1986)
- Feltia beringiana (Lafontaine & Kononenko, 1986)
- Feltia boreana (Lafontaine, 1986)
- Feltia evanidalis (Grote, 1878) (syn: Feltia californiae McDunnough, 1939)
- Feltia floridensis Lafontaine, 2004
- Feltia geniculata Grote & Robinson, 1868
- Feltia herilis (Grote, 1873)
- Feltia inyoca Lafontaine, 2004
- Feltia jaculifera (Guenée, 1852)
- Feltia manifesta (Morrison, 1875)
- Feltia mollis (Walker, [1857])
- Feltia nigrita (Graeser, 1892) (formerly in Trichosilia)
- Feltia repleta (Walker, 1857)
- Feltia subgothica (Haworth, 1809)
- Feltia subterranea (Fabricius, 1794)
- Feltia tricosa (Lintner, 1874)
- Feltia troubridgei Lafontaine, 2004
- Feltia woodiana (Lafontaine, 1986)
