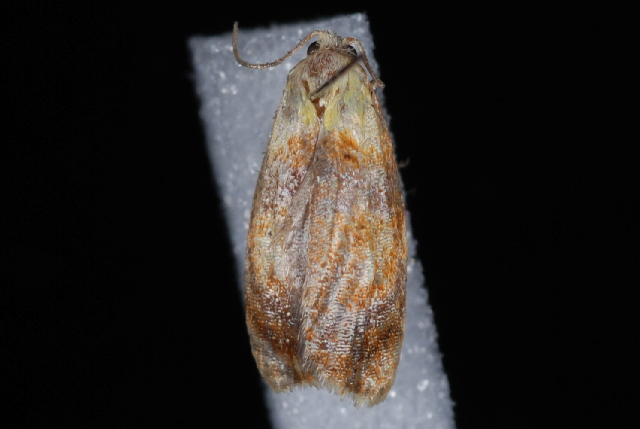

Scientific classification
- Domain: Eukaryota
- Kingdom: Animalia
- Phylum: Arthropoda
- Class: Insecta
- Order: Lepidoptera
- Family: Tortricidae
- Genus: Acleris
- Species: A. curvalana

Binomial name
- Acleris curvalana (Kearfott, 1907)

Synonyms
- Tortrix curvalana Kearfott, 1907; Croesia curvalana

= Acleris curvalana =

Species of moth

Acleris curvalana, the blueberry leaftier moth, is a species of moth of the family Tortricidae. It is found in North America, where it has been recorded from Alabama, Alberta, Arkansas, British Columbia, Florida, Georgia, Indiana, Kentucky, Maine, Manitoba, Maryland, Massachusetts, Michigan, Minnesota, Mississippi, New Brunswick, New Hampshire, New York, Newfoundland, North Carolina, Ohio, Ontario, Pennsylvania, Quebec, Saskatchewan, Tennessee, Virginia, Washington and West Virginia.

The wingspan is about 14 mm. The forewings are pale lemon yellow, overcast with bright ochreous red. The base of the wing is yellow, as is a small margin along the termen. There is a round yellowish spot in the middle of the wing. Adults have been recorded on wing from March to August.

The larvae feed on Vaccinium angustifolium, Vaccinium pallidum, Gaylussacia baccata, Quercus and Rosa species.
