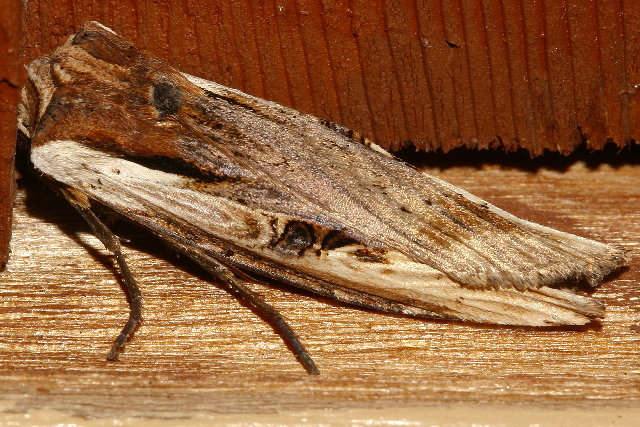

Scientific classification
- Domain: Eukaryota
- Kingdom: Animalia
- Phylum: Arthropoda
- Class: Insecta
- Order: Lepidoptera
- Superfamily: Noctuoidea
- Family: Noctuidae
- Tribe: Xylenini
- Subtribe: Xylenina
- Genus: Xylena
- Species: X. curvimacula

Binomial name
- Xylena curvimacula (Morrison, 1874)

= Xylena curvimacula =

Species of moth

Xylena curvimacula, known generally as the swordgrass moth or dot-and-dash swordgrass moth, is a species of cutworm or dart moth in the family Noctuidae. It lives in North America.

The MONA or Hodges number for X. curvimacula is 9874.
