= Eueretagrotis sigmoides =

Scientific classification
- Kingdom: Animalia
- Phylum: Arthropoda
- Class: Insecta
- Order: Lepidoptera
- Superfamily: Noctuoidea
- Family: Noctuidae
- Genus: Eueretagrotis
- Species: E. sigmoides

Binomial name
- Eueretagrotis sigmoides (Guenée, 1852)

Species of moth

The sigmoid dart (Eueretagrotis sigmoides) is a moth of the family Noctuidae. It is found in eastern North America species. In southern Canada it is found from Ontario to central Saskatchewan, and in the United States from Maine to Minnesota, south to western Maryland, Ohio, and western Kentucky. It has recently been recorded from North Carolina and Tennessee.

The wingspan is about 40 mm. Adults are on wing from June to July.
