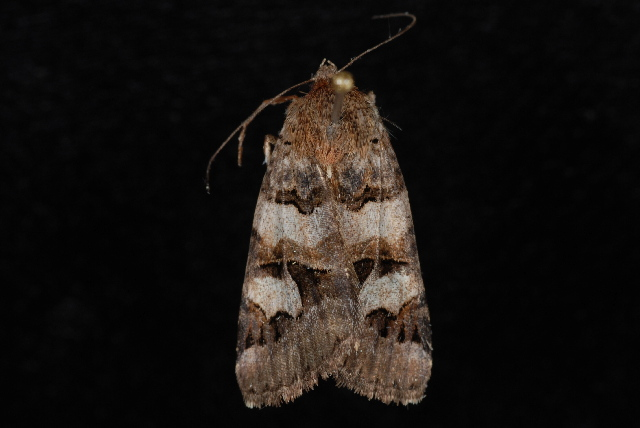

Scientific classification
- Kingdom: Animalia
- Phylum: Arthropoda
- Class: Insecta
- Order: Lepidoptera
- Superfamily: Noctuoidea
- Family: Erebidae
- Genus: Drasteria
- Species: D. adumbrata

Binomial name
- Drasteria adumbrata (Behr, 1870)

Synonyms
- Syneda adumbrata Behr, 1870; Synedoida adumbrata (Behr, 1870); Syneda alleni Grote, 1877; Syneda saxea Edwards, 1881

= Drasteria adumbrata =

Shadowy arches

Species of moth

Drasteria adumbrata, the shadowy arches, is a moth of the family Erebidae. The species was first described by Hans Hermann Behr in 1870. It is found from coast to coast in southern Canada, south in the west to California and Colorado, south in the east to New England and Michigan. Subspecies D. a. alleni is found from eastern Alberta to New York and Nova Scotia. Subspecies D. a. saxea occurs from southern British Columbia and south-west Alberta south to California and Colorado.

The wingspan is about 32 mm. Adults are on wing in summer.

The larvae feed on Vaccinium angustifolium and probably other Vaccinium species. It has also been recorded on Arctostaphylos uva-ursi.

== Subspecies ==
- Drasteria adumbrata adumbrata
- Drasteria adumbrata alleni (Grote, 1877) (eastern North America, reaching as far west as Alberta)
- Drasteria adumbrata saxea (Edwards, 1881) (from southern Alberta and British Columbia to California and Colorado)
