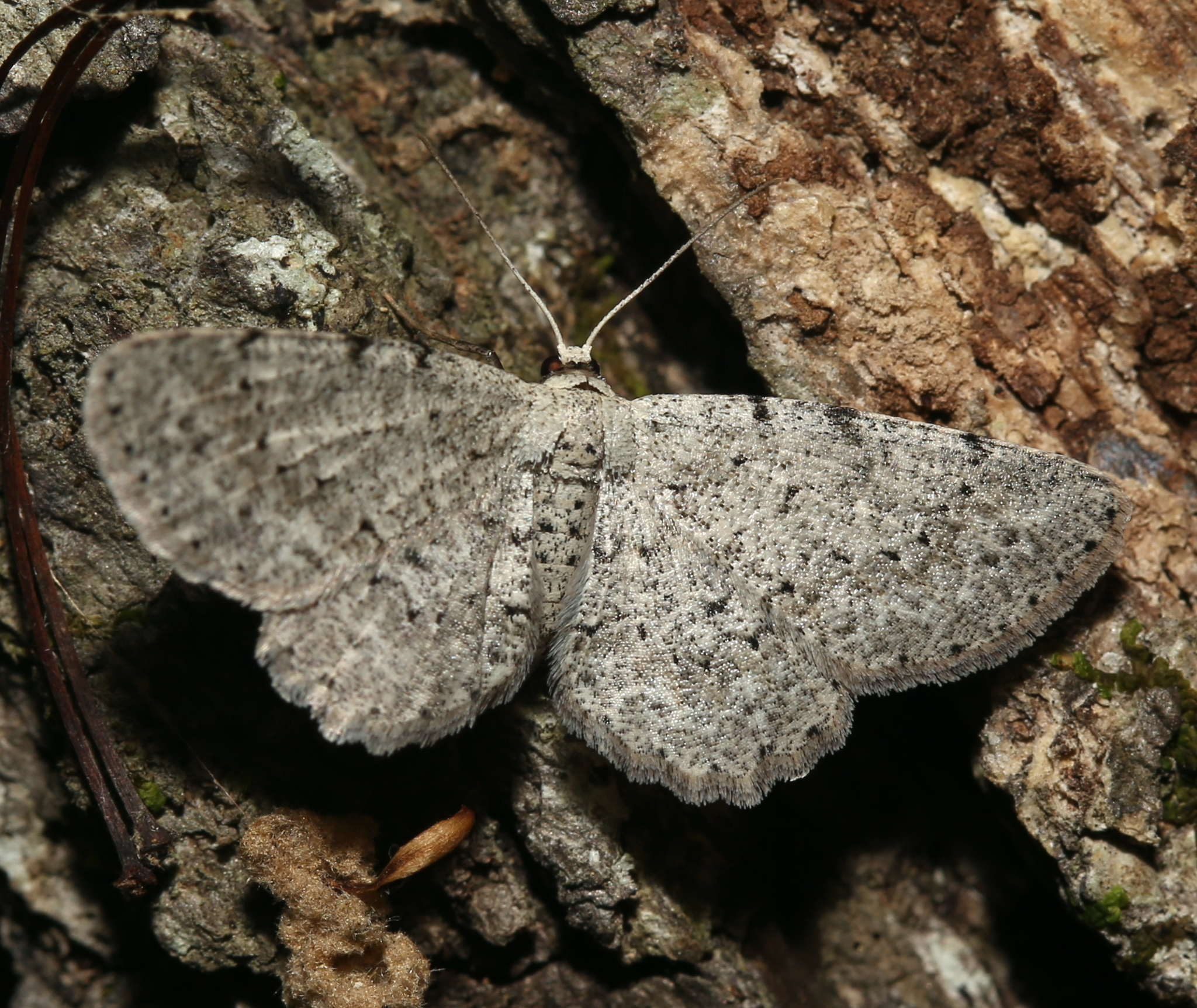

Scientific classification
- Kingdom: Animalia
- Phylum: Arthropoda
- Class: Insecta
- Order: Lepidoptera
- Family: Geometridae
- Tribe: Boarmiini
- Genus: Glena
- Species: G. cribrataria

Binomial name
- Glena cribrataria (Guenée in Boisduval & Guenée, 1858)

= Glena cribrataria =

Species of moth

Glena cribrataria, the dotted gray, is a species of geometrid moth in the family Geometridae. It is found in North America.

The MONA or Hodges number for Glena cribrataria is 6449.
