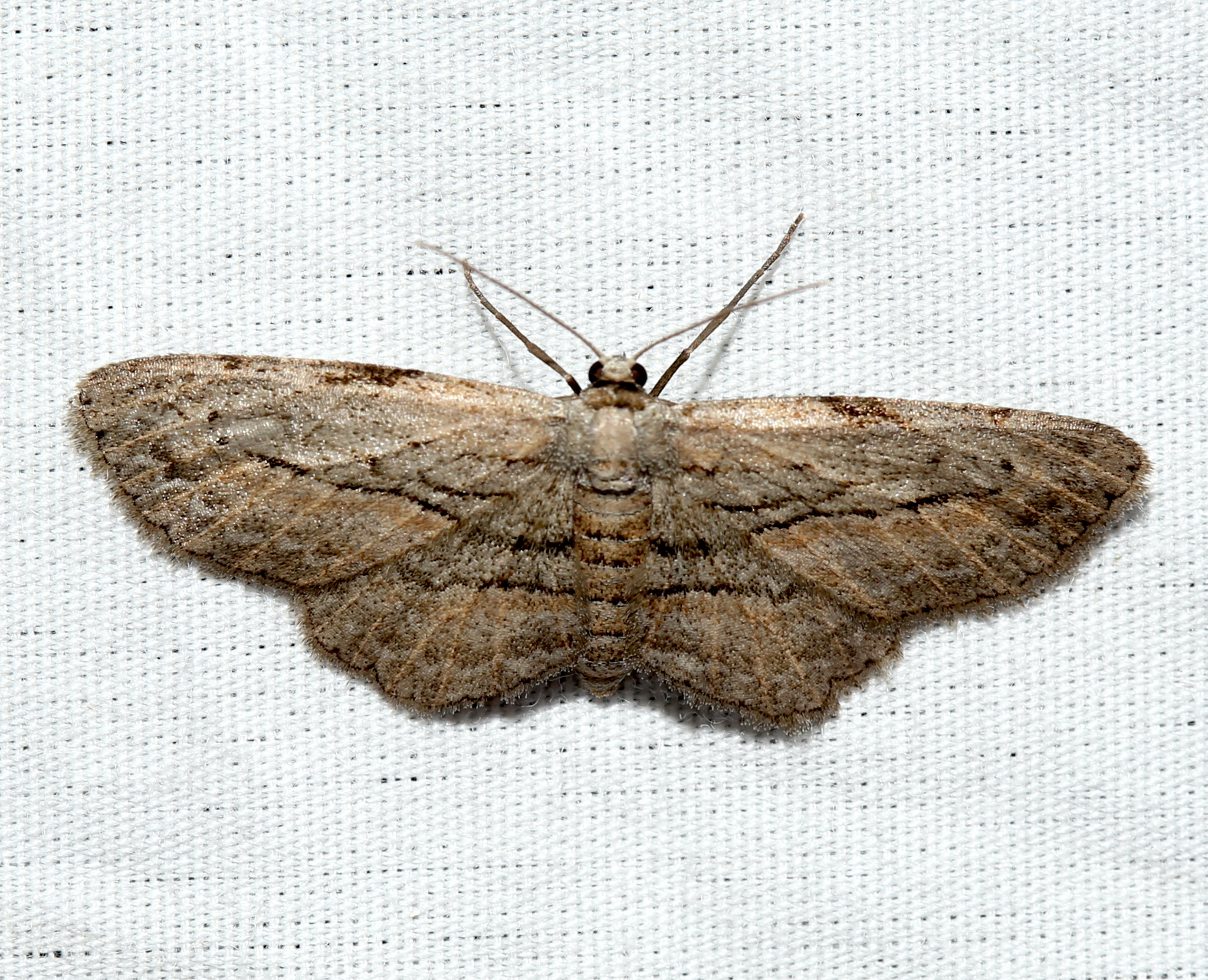

Scientific classification
- Kingdom: Animalia
- Phylum: Arthropoda
- Clade: Pancrustacea
- Class: Insecta
- Order: Lepidoptera
- Family: Geometridae
- Genus: Glena
- Species: G. plumosaria

Binomial name
- Glena plumosaria (Packard, 1874)

Synonyms
- Cymatophora plumosaria Packard, 1874

= Glena plumosaria =

Species of moth

Glena plumosaria, the dainty gray moth or plumose gray moth, is a species of moth in the family Geometridae. It is found in North America, where it has been recorded from Alabama, Florida, Georgia, Indiana, Iowa, Kentucky, Maryland, New Jersey, North Carolina, Ohio, South Carolina, Tennessee and Virginia.

The length of the forewings is 13–14 mm for males and about 16 mm for females. Adults are on wing from March to October.
