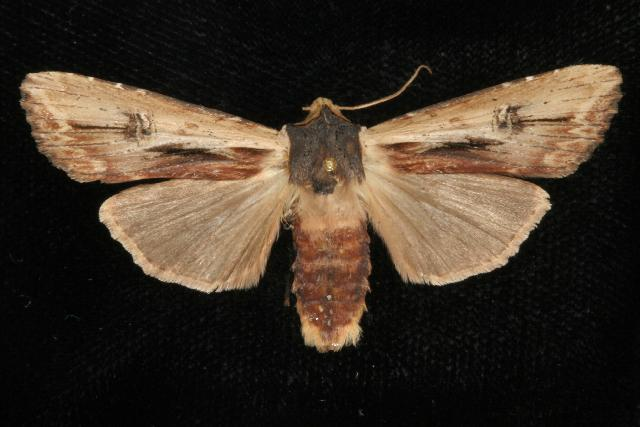

Scientific classification
- Domain: Eukaryota
- Kingdom: Animalia
- Phylum: Arthropoda
- Class: Insecta
- Order: Lepidoptera
- Superfamily: Noctuoidea
- Family: Noctuidae
- Genus: Xylena
- Species: X. nupera

Binomial name
- Xylena nupera (Lintner, 1874)

= Xylena nupera =

Species of moth

Xylena nupera, known generally as the American swordgrass moth or red swordgrass moth, is a species of cutworm or dart moth in the family Noctuidae. It is found in North America, from New Jersey to Nova Scotia and west from northern California to British Columbia.

The MONA or Hodges number for Xylena nupera is 9873.
