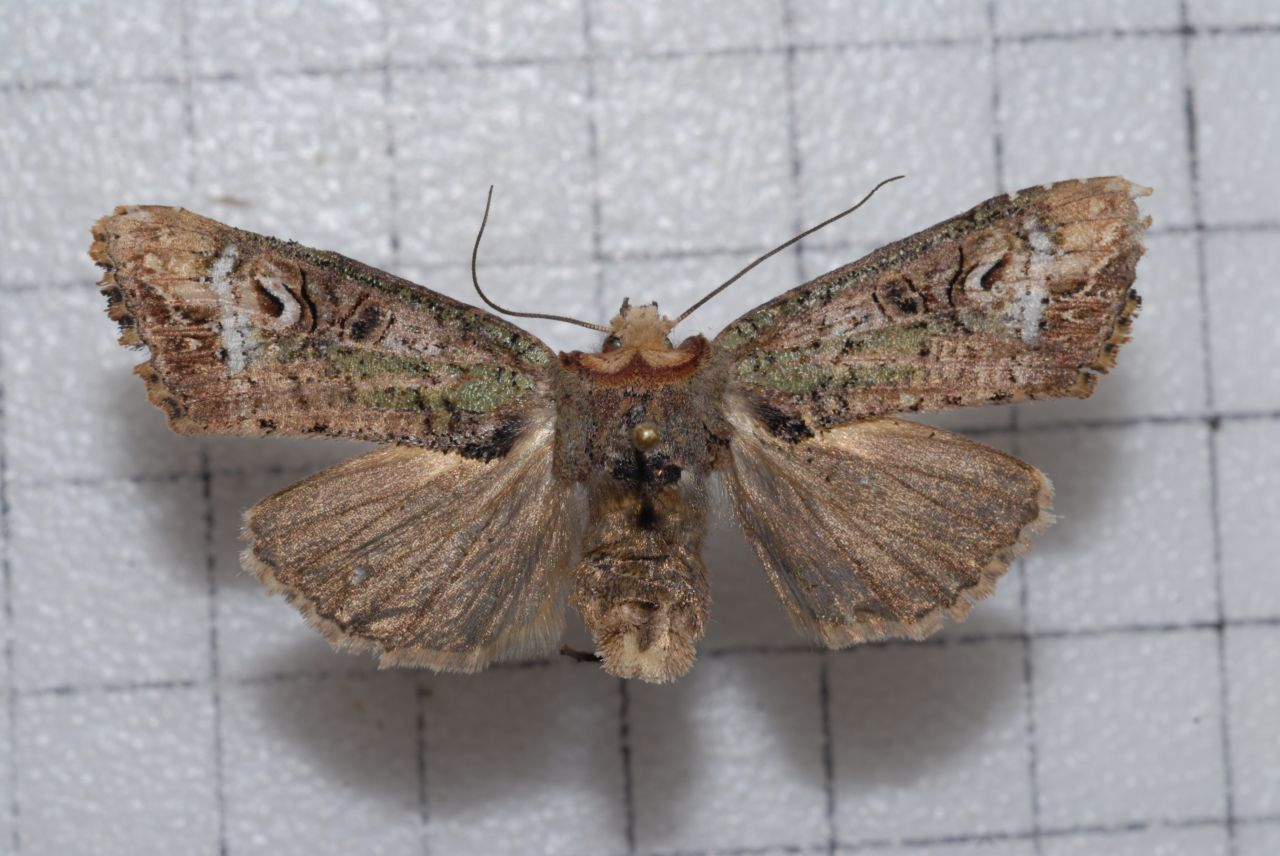
- Female
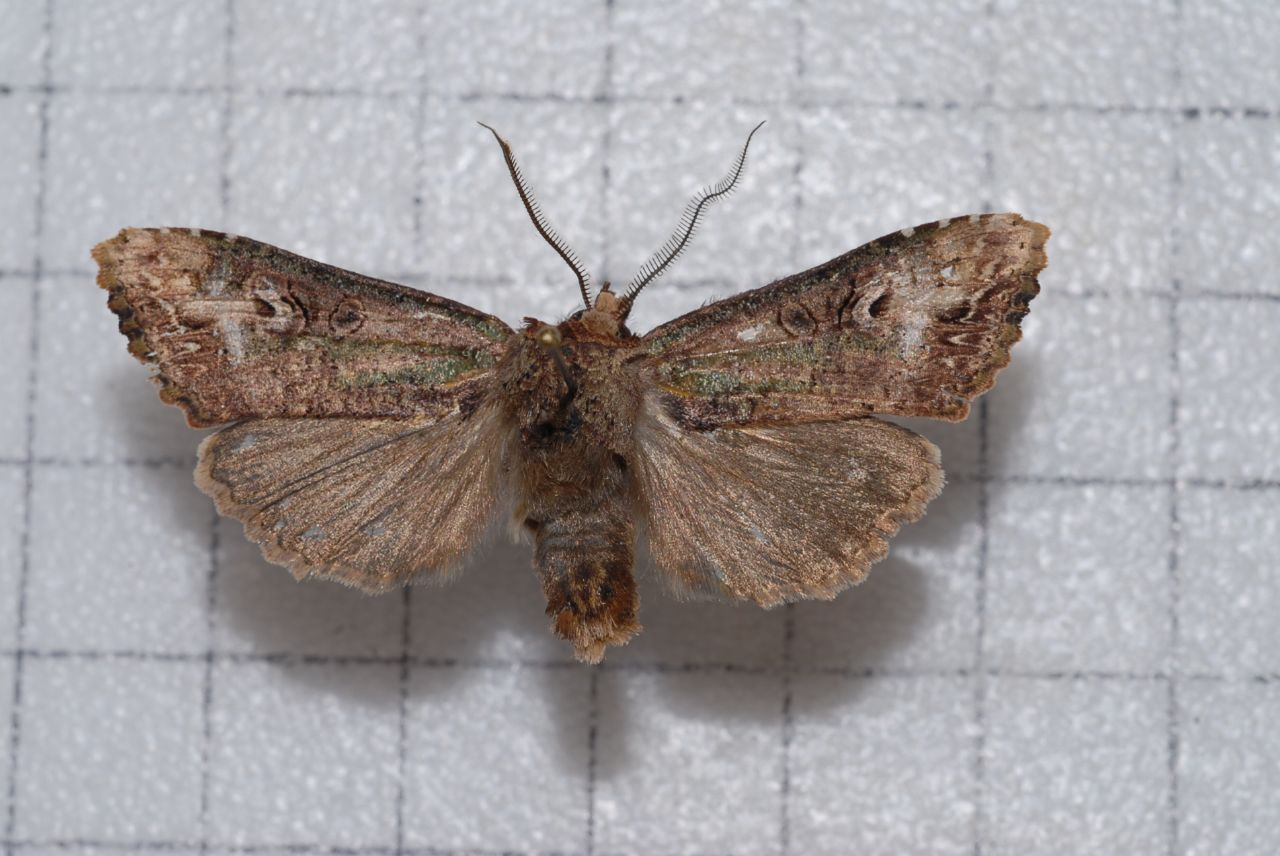
- Male

Scientific classification
- Domain: Eukaryota
- Kingdom: Animalia
- Phylum: Arthropoda
- Class: Insecta
- Order: Lepidoptera
- Superfamily: Noctuoidea
- Family: Noctuidae
- Genus: Xylena
- Species: X. tatajiana

Binomial name
- Xylena tatajiana Chang, 1991

= Xylena tatajiana =

Species of moth

Xylena tatajiana is a species of moth of the family Noctuidae. It is found in Taiwan.

== Subspecies ==
- Xylena tatajiana tatajiana
- Xylena tatajiana pectinicornis Hreblay & Ronkay, 1998
