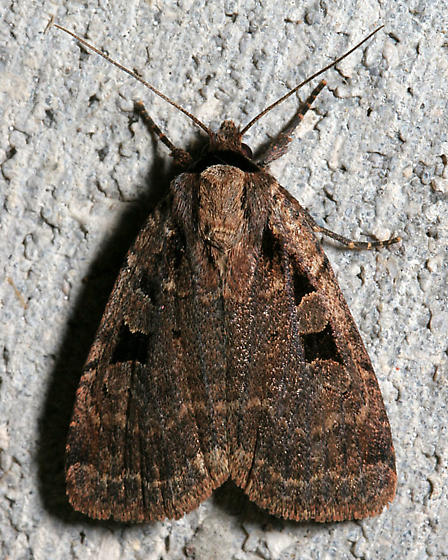
- Eueretagrotis perattenta

Scientific classification
- Domain: Eukaryota
- Kingdom: Animalia
- Phylum: Arthropoda
- Class: Insecta
- Order: Lepidoptera
- Superfamily: Noctuoidea
- Family: Noctuidae
- Subtribe: Noctuina
- Genus: Eueretagrotis; Smith, 1890

= Eueretagrotis =

Genus of moths

Eueretagrotis is a genus of moths of the family Noctuidae.

== Species ==
- Eueretagrotis attentus (Grote, 1874)
- Eueretagrotis perattentus (Grote, 1876)
- Eueretagrotis sigmoides (Guenée, 1852)
