= Feltia manifesta =

Scientific classification
- Domain: Eukaryota
- Kingdom: Animalia
- Phylum: Arthropoda
- Class: Insecta
- Order: Lepidoptera
- Superfamily: Noctuoidea
- Family: Noctuidae
- Tribe: Noctuini
- Subtribe: Agrotina
- Genus: Feltia
- Species: F. manifesta

Binomial name
- Feltia manifesta (Morrison, 1875)

Species of moth

Feltia manifesta is a species of cutworm or dart moth in the family Noctuidae. It is found in North America.

The MONA or Hodges number for Feltia manifesta is 10666.
