= Glena furfuraria =

Scientific classification
- Domain: Eukaryota
- Kingdom: Animalia
- Phylum: Arthropoda
- Class: Insecta
- Order: Lepidoptera
- Family: Geometridae
- Genus: Glena
- Species: G. furfuraria

Binomial name
- Glena furfuraria (Hulst, 1888)

Species of moth

Glena furfuraria is a species of geometrid moth in the family Geometridae. It is found in North America.

The MONA or Hodges number for Glena furfuraria is 6446.

== Subspecies ==
These two subspecies belong to the species Glena furfuraria:

- Glena furfuraria furfuraria
- Glena furfuraria minor Sperry, 1952
