= Glena grisearia =

Scientific classification
- Domain: Eukaryota
- Kingdom: Animalia
- Phylum: Arthropoda
- Class: Insecta
- Order: Lepidoptera
- Family: Geometridae
- Genus: Glena
- Species: G. grisearia

Binomial name
- Glena grisearia (Grote, 1883)

Species of moth

Glena grisearia is a species of geometrid moth in the family Geometridae. It is found in North America.

The MONA or Hodges number for Glena grisearia is 6445.
