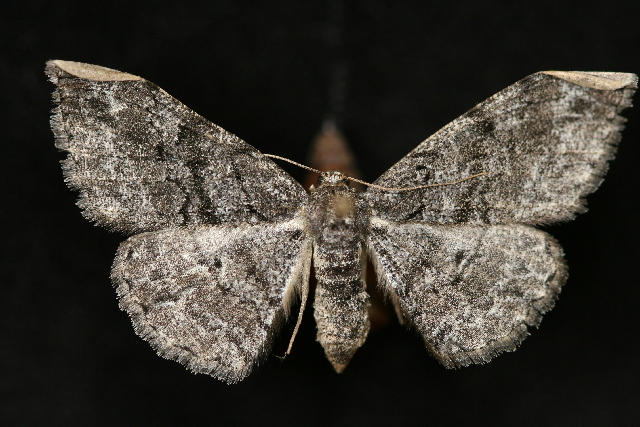

Scientific classification
- Kingdom: Animalia
- Phylum: Arthropoda
- Class: Insecta
- Order: Lepidoptera
- Family: Geometridae
- Genus: Glena
- Species: G. nigricaria

Binomial name
- Glena nigricaria (Barnes & McDunnough, 1913)

= Glena nigricaria =

Species of moth

Glena nigricaria is a species of moth in the family Geometridae first described by William Barnes and James Halliday McDunnough in 1913. It is found in Central and North America.

The MONA or Hodges number for Glena nigricaria is 6448.

== Distribution ==
This species predominantly occurs in the southern region of British Columbia and is also found in parts south of Mexico.
