= Feltia evanidalis =

Scientific classification
- Kingdom: Animalia
- Phylum: Arthropoda
- Class: Insecta
- Order: Lepidoptera
- Superfamily: Noctuoidea
- Family: Noctuidae
- Genus: Feltia
- Species: F. evanidalis

Binomial name
- Feltia evanidalis (Grote, 1878)

Synonyms
- Feltia californiae McDunnough, 1939

Species of moth

Feltia evanidalis is a species of cutworm or dart moth in the family Noctuidae. It is found in North America.

The MONA or Hodges number for Feltia evanidalis is 10672.
