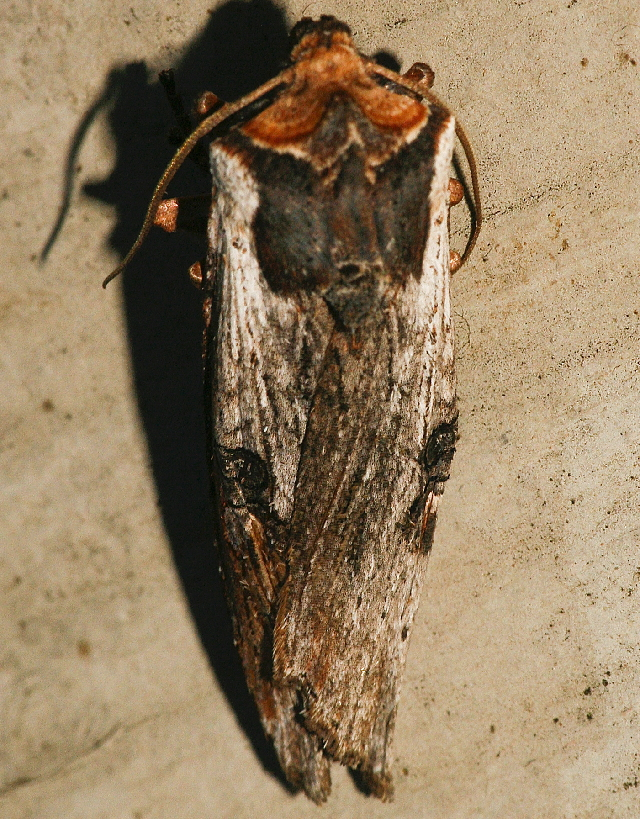

Scientific classification
- Domain: Eukaryota
- Kingdom: Animalia
- Phylum: Arthropoda
- Class: Insecta
- Order: Lepidoptera
- Superfamily: Noctuoidea
- Family: Noctuidae
- Tribe: Xylenini
- Subtribe: Xylenina
- Genus: Xylena
- Species: X. thoracica

Binomial name
- Xylena thoracica (Putnam-Cramer, 1886)

= Xylena thoracica =

Species of moth

Xylena thoracica, the acadian swordgrass moth, is a species of cutworm or dart moth in the family Noctuidae. It is found in North America.

The MONA or Hodges number for Xylena thoracica is 9875.
