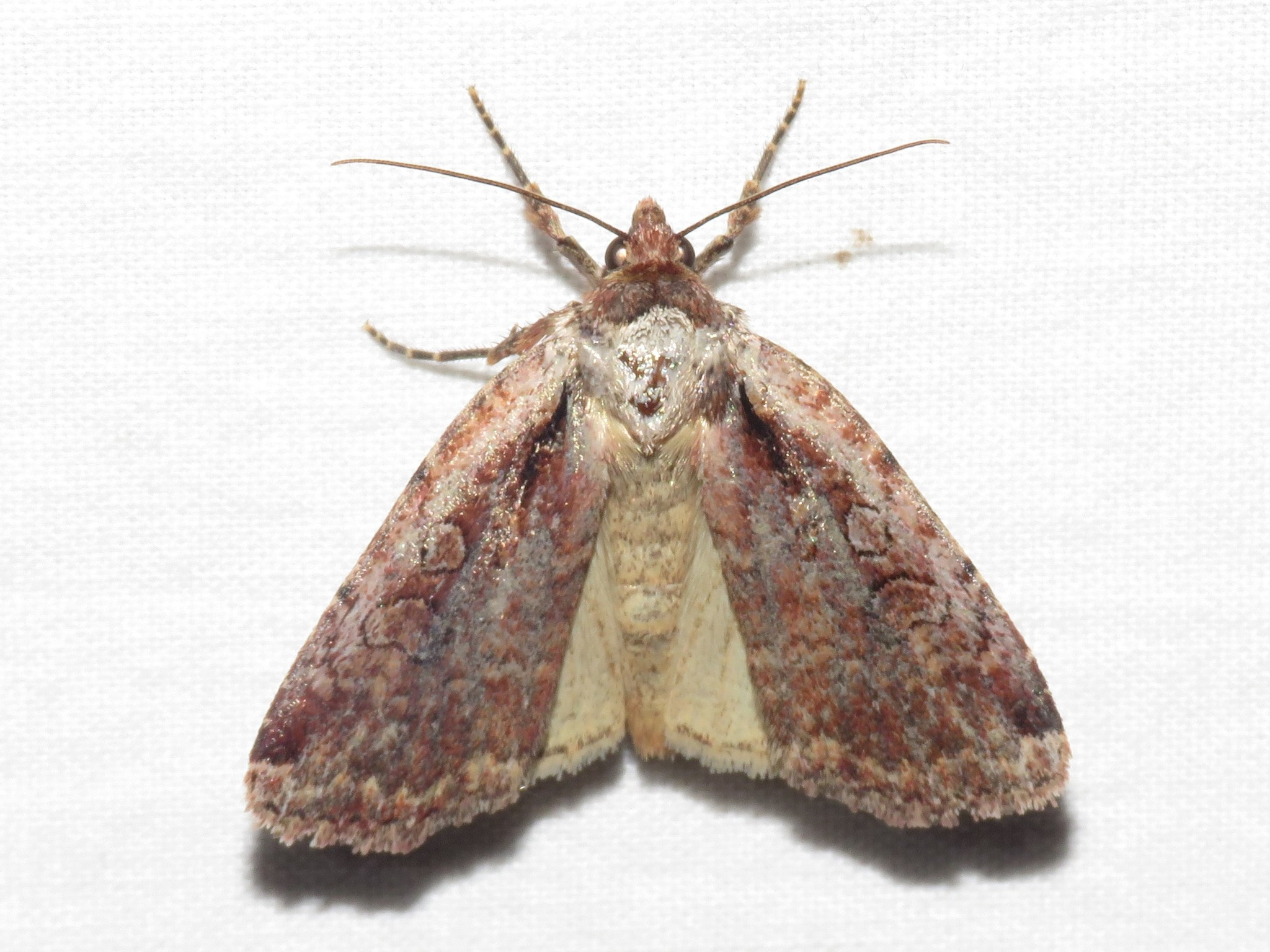

Scientific classification
- Kingdom: Animalia
- Phylum: Arthropoda
- Class: Insecta
- Order: Lepidoptera
- Superfamily: Noctuoidea
- Family: Noctuidae
- Genus: Eueretagrotis
- Species: E. attentus

Binomial name
- Eueretagrotis attentus (Grote, 1874)

Synonyms
- Eueretagrotis attenta

= Eueretagrotis attentus =

Species of insect

Eueretagrotis attentus, the attentive dart or daggered heath dart, is a species of moth in the family Noctuidae. It is found in North America from Nova Scotia to Saskatchewan and adjacent northern states, south in the Appalachians to Great Smoky Mountains National Park (North Carolina and Tennessee). There is one record from northern Georgia.

The wingspan is 30–35 mm. Adults are on wing from June to August. There is one generation per year.

The larvae feed on Vaccinium, Salix, Betula alleghaniensis, Sambucus and Fragaria.
