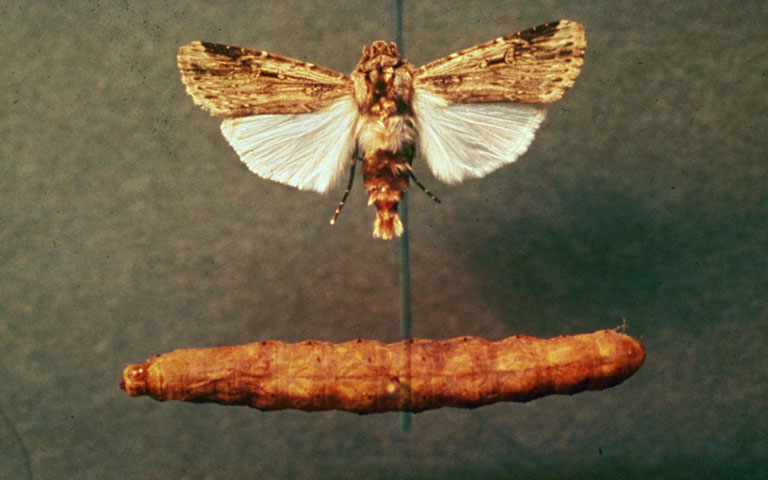

Scientific classification
- Domain: Eukaryota
- Kingdom: Animalia
- Phylum: Arthropoda
- Class: Insecta
- Order: Lepidoptera
- Superfamily: Noctuoidea
- Family: Noctuidae
- Genus: Feltia
- Species: F. subterranea

Binomial name
- Feltia subterranea (Fabricius, 1794)

Synonyms
- Agrotis subterranea (Fabricius, 1794); Noctua subterranea Fabricius, 1794; Agrotis annexa Treitschke, 1825; Agrotis anteposita Guenée, 1852; Noctua lutescens Blanchard, 1852; Euxoa lutescens (Blanchard, 1852); Agrotis decernens Walker, [1857]; Agrotis interferens Walker, 1858; Xylina lutaea Druce, 1889; Agrotis interposita Maassen, 1890; Euxoa williamsi Schaus, 1923; Agrotis blanchardi Berg, 1882

= Feltia subterranea =

Species of moth

Feltia subterranea, formerly known as Agrotis subterranea, and commonly known as the granulate cutworm, subterranean dart moth, or tawny shoulder, is a moth of the family Noctuidae. It is found in North America, from Massachusetts and New York to California and the southern parts of the United States and Mexico. It is also present in Central America and South America where it has been reported in Honduras, Costa Rica, Cuba, Panama, Venezuela, Colombia, South-East Brazil, Uruguay, Chile, and the Antilles.

Illustration

The wingspan is 38–44 mm.

The larvae feed on a wide range of plants, including over 61 hosts of economic importance.

The adults are a pollinator of fetterbush lyonia.
