= Glena interpunctata =

Scientific classification
- Kingdom: Animalia
- Phylum: Arthropoda
- Class: Insecta
- Order: Lepidoptera
- Family: Geometridae
- Genus: Glena
- Species: G. interpunctata

Binomial name
- Glena interpunctata (Barnes & McDunnough, 1917)

Species of moth

Glena interpunctata is a species of moth in the family Geometridae first described by William Barnes and James Halliday McDunnough in 1917. It is found in North America.

The MONA or Hodges number for Glena interpunctata is 6451.

== Subspecies ==
Two subspecies belong to Glena interpunctata:

- Glena interpunctata interpunctata^{g}
- Glena interpunctata thomasaria Sperry, 1952^{c g}

Data sources: i = ITIS, c = Catalogue of Life, g = GBIF, b = BugGuide
