= Xylena brucei =

Scientific classification
- Domain: Eukaryota
- Kingdom: Animalia
- Phylum: Arthropoda
- Class: Insecta
- Order: Lepidoptera
- Superfamily: Noctuoidea
- Family: Noctuidae
- Tribe: Xylenini
- Subtribe: Xylenina
- Genus: Xylena
- Species: X. brucei

Binomial name
- Xylena brucei (Smith, 1892)

Species of moth

Xylena brucei, or Bruce's swordgrass moth, is a species of cutworm or dart moth in the family Noctuidae. It is found in North America.

The MONA or Hodges number for Xylena brucei is 9877.
