= Feltia repleta =

Scientific classification
- Kingdom: Animalia
- Phylum: Arthropoda
- Class: Insecta
- Order: Lepidoptera
- Superfamily: Noctuoidea
- Family: Noctuidae
- Genus: Feltia
- Species: F. repleta

Binomial name
- Feltia repleta (Walker, 1857)

Synonyms
- Agrotis repleta Walker, 1857; Agrotis submuscosa Herrich-Schaffer, 1868

Species of moth

The replete dart (Feltia repleta) is a moth of the family Noctuidae. It is a tropical species found from Argentina and Brazil to Mexico and occurs occasionally in Florida, Louisiana and southern Texas.

The wingspan is 45–50 mm.

The larvae feed on a wide variety of plants, including various agricultural crops such as tomatoes.
