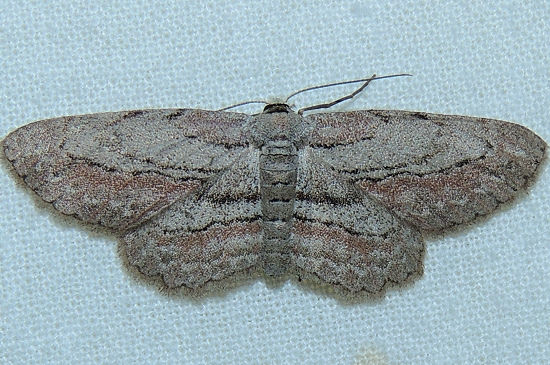
- Glena plumosaria

Scientific classification
- Kingdom: Animalia
- Phylum: Arthropoda
- Class: Insecta
- Order: Lepidoptera
- Family: Geometridae
- Tribe: Boarmiini
- Genus: Glena; Hulst, 1896

Synonyms
- Hetererannis Warren, 1904; Monroa Warren, 1904

= Glena =

Genus of moths

Glena is a genus of moths in the family Geometridae.

== Species ==
- Glena agria Rindge, 1967
- Glena arcana Rindge, 1958
- Glena asaccula Rindge, 1967
- Glena basalis Rindge, 1967
- Glena bipennaria (Guenée, 1858)
- Glena bisulca Rindge, 1967
- Glena brachia Rindge, 1967
- Glena bulla Rindge, 1967
- Glena cognataria (Hubner, 1831)
- Glena cretacea (Butler, 1881)
- Glena cribrataria (Guenée, 1857)
- Glena demissaria (Walker, 1860)
- Glena dentata Rindge, 1967
- Glena effusa Rindge, 1967
- Glena furfuraria (Hulst, 1888)
- Glena gampsa Rindge, 1967
- Glena gemina Rindge, 1967
- Glena granillosa (Dognin, 1902)
- Glena grisearia (Grote, 1883)
- Glena hima Rindge, 1967
- Glena interpunctata (Barnes & McDunnough, 1917)
- Glena juga Rindge, 1967
- Glena labecula Rindge, 1967
- Glena laticolla Rindge, 1967
- Glena lora Rindge, 1967
- Glena mcdunnougharia Sperry, 1952
- Glena megale Rindge, 1967
- Glena mielkei Vargas, 2010
- Glena mopsaria (Schaus, 1913)
- Glena nepia (Druce, 1892)
- Glena nigricaria (Barnes & McDunnough, 1913)
- Glena plumosaria (Packard, 1874)
- Glena quadrata Rindge, 1967
- Glena quinquelinearia (Packard, 1874)
- Glena sacca Rindge, 1967
- Glena subannulata (Prout, 1910)
- Glena sucula Rindge, 1967
- Glena totana Rindge, 1967
- Glena trapezia Rindge, 1967
- Glena turba Rindge, 1967
- Glena tyrbe Rindge, 1967
- Glena uncata Rindge, 1967
- Glena unipennaria (Guenée, 1858)
- Glena vesana Rindge, 1967
- Glena zweifeli Rindge, 1965
