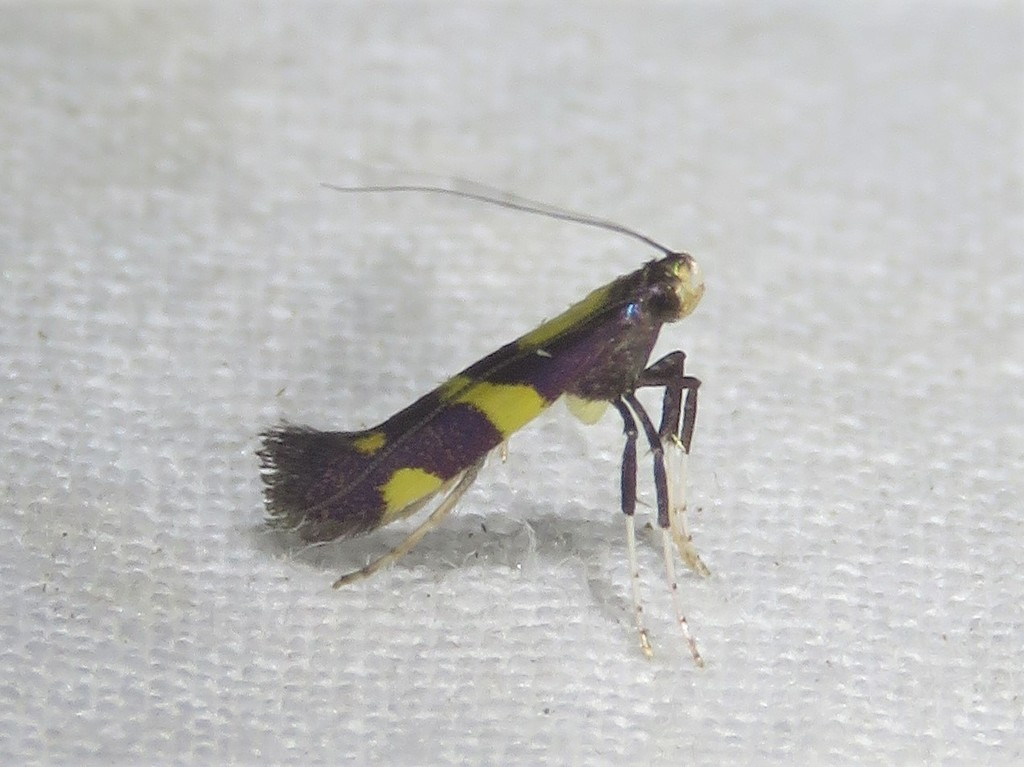

Scientific classification
- Kingdom: Animalia
- Phylum: Arthropoda
- Clade: Pancrustacea
- Class: Insecta
- Order: Lepidoptera
- Family: Gracillariidae
- Genus: Caloptilia
- Species: C. vacciniella

Binomial name
- Caloptilia vacciniella (Ely, 1915)

= Caloptilia vacciniella =

Species of moth

Caloptilia vacciniella is a moth of the family Gracillariidae. It is known from Quebec, Canada, and Pennsylvania, Maine and Michigan in the United States.

The larvae feed on Vaccinium species, including Vaccinium angustifolium, Vaccinium corymbosum and Vaccinium pallidum. They mine the leaves of their host plant.
