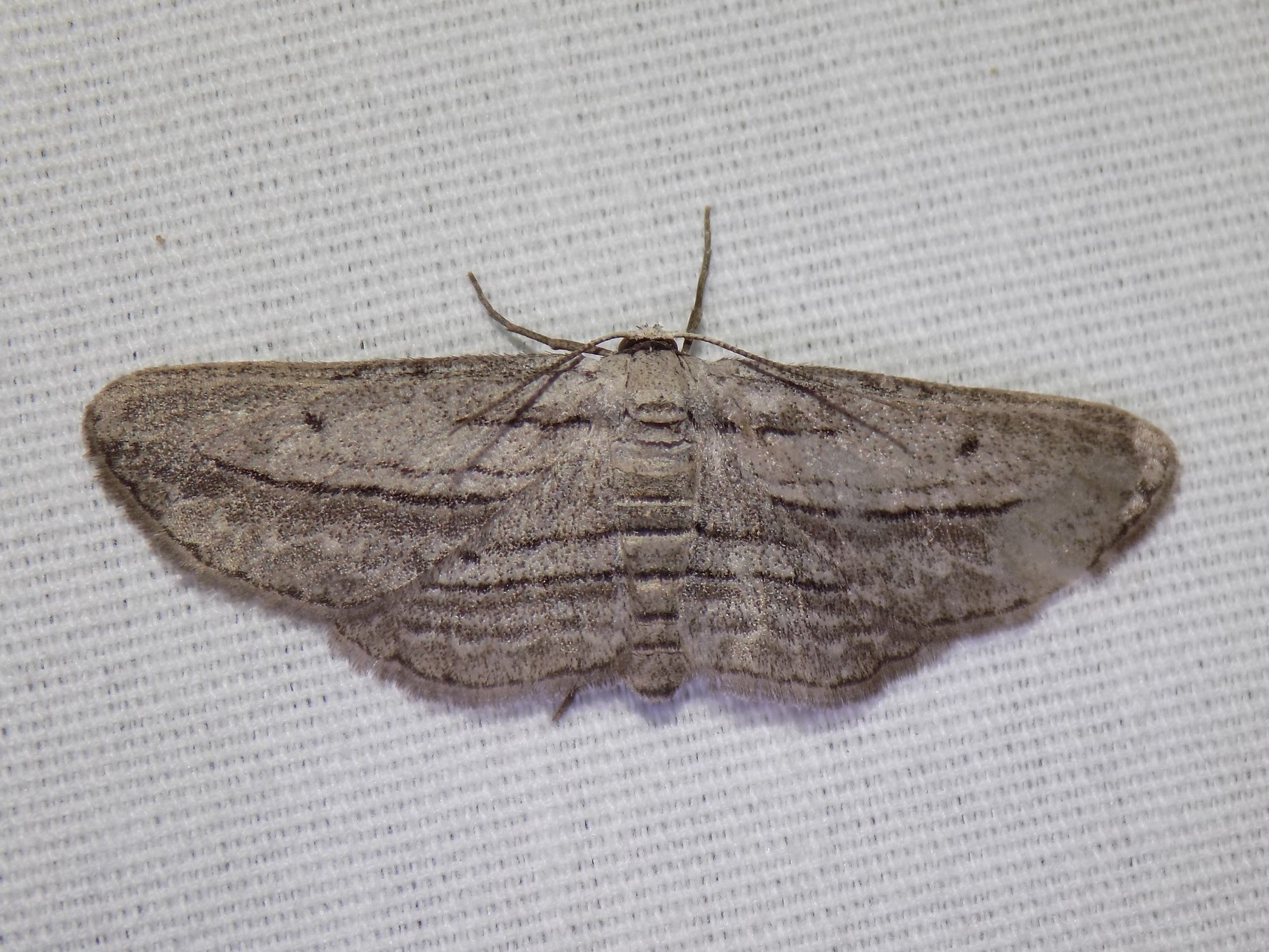

Scientific classification
- Kingdom: Animalia
- Phylum: Arthropoda
- Clade: Pancrustacea
- Class: Insecta
- Order: Lepidoptera
- Family: Geometridae
- Genus: Glena
- Species: G. quinquelinearia

Binomial name
- Glena quinquelinearia (Packard, 1874)

= Glena quinquelinearia =

Species of moth

Glena quinquelinearia, the five-lined gray, is a species of geometrid moth in the family Geometridae. It was described by Alpheus Spring Packard in 1874 and is found in North America.
