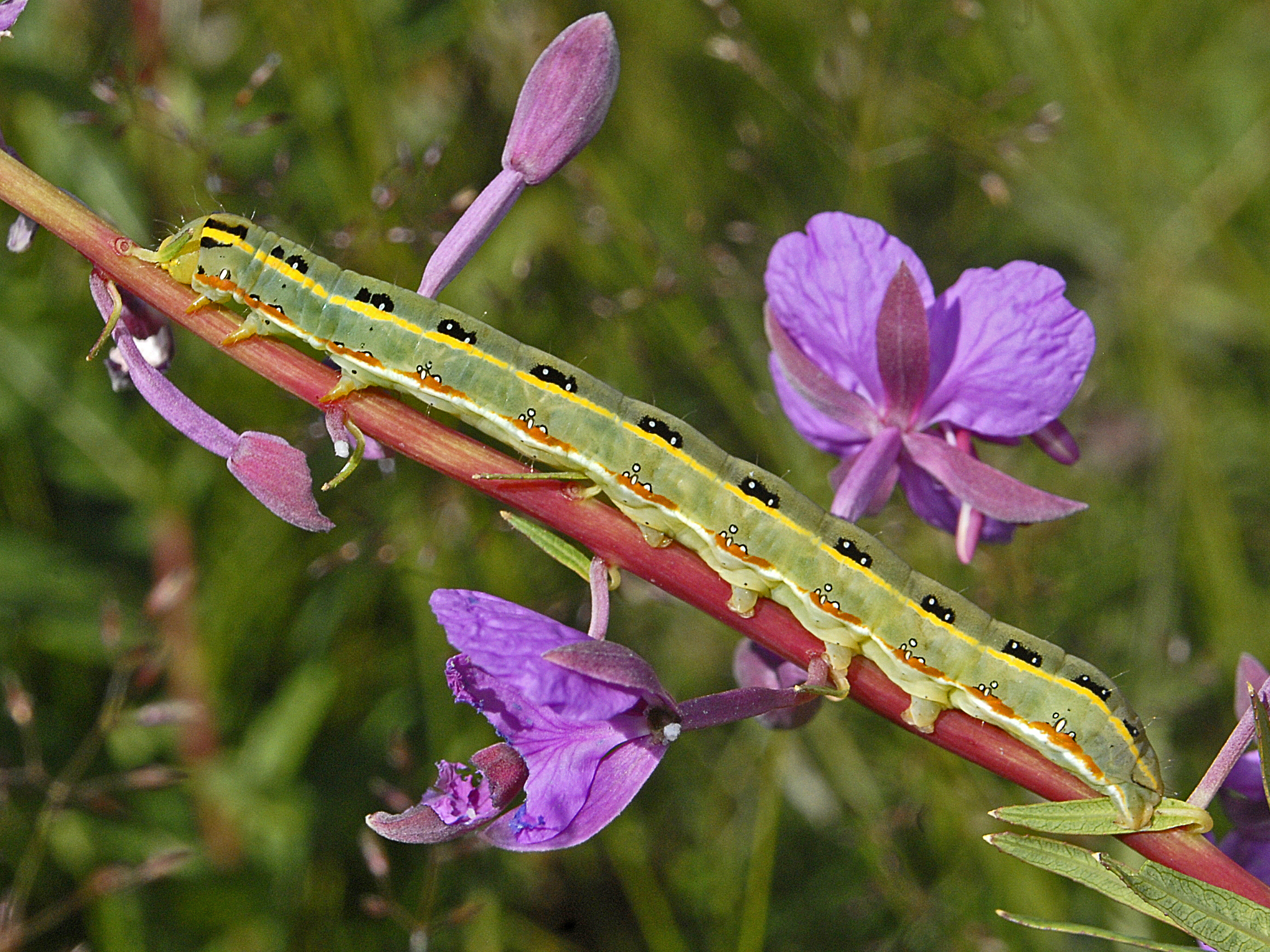
- Caterpillar of Xylena exsoleta

Scientific classification
- Domain: Eukaryota
- Kingdom: Animalia
- Phylum: Arthropoda
- Class: Insecta
- Order: Lepidoptera
- Superfamily: Noctuoidea
- Family: Noctuidae
- Subtribe: Xylenina
- Genus: Xylena; Ochsenheimer, 1816

= Xylena =

Genus of moths

Xylena is a genus of moths of the family Noctuidae.

== Species ==
- Xylena apicimacula Yoshimoto, 1993
- Xylena brucei – Bruce's swordgrass (Smith, 1892)
- Xylena buckwelli Rungs, 1952
- Xylena changi Horie, 1993
- Xylena cineritia – gray swordgrass (Grote, 1874)
- Xylena confusa Kononenko & Ronkay, 1998
- Xylena curvimacula – dot-and-dash swordgrass (Morrison, 1874)
- Xylena exsoleta – sword-grass (Linnaeus, 1758)
- Xylena formosa (Butler, 1878)
- Xylena fumosa (Butler, 1878)
- Xylena lunifera (Warren, 1010)
- Xylena nepalina Yoshimoto, 1993
- Xylena nihonica (Hoene, 1917)
- Xylena nupera – American swordgrass (Lintner, 1874)
- Xylena plumbeopaca Hreblay & Ronkay, 2000
- Xylena sugii Kobayashi, 1993
- Xylena tanabei Owada, 1993
- Xylena tatajiana Chang, 1991
- Xylena thoracica – acadian swordgrass (Putnam-Cramer, 1886)
- Xylena vetusta – red sword-grass (Hübner, [1813])
