= Feltia inyoca =

Scientific classification
- Domain: Eukaryota
- Kingdom: Animalia
- Phylum: Arthropoda
- Class: Insecta
- Order: Lepidoptera
- Superfamily: Noctuoidea
- Family: Noctuidae
- Tribe: Noctuini
- Subtribe: Agrotina
- Genus: Feltia
- Species: F. inyoca

Binomial name
- Feltia inyoca Lafontaine, 2004

Species of moth

Feltia inyoca is a species of cutworm or dart moth in the family Noctuidae. It is found in North America.

The MONA or Hodges number for Feltia inyoca is 10670.1.
