= Feltia mollis =

Scientific classification
- Kingdom: Animalia
- Phylum: Arthropoda
- Class: Insecta
- Order: Lepidoptera
- Superfamily: Noctuoidea
- Family: Noctuidae
- Genus: Feltia
- Species: F. mollis

Binomial name
- Feltia mollis (Walker, 1857)

Species of moth

Feltia mollis is a species of cutworm or dart moth in the family Noctuidae. It is found in North America.

The MONA or Hodges number for Feltia mollis is 10644.
