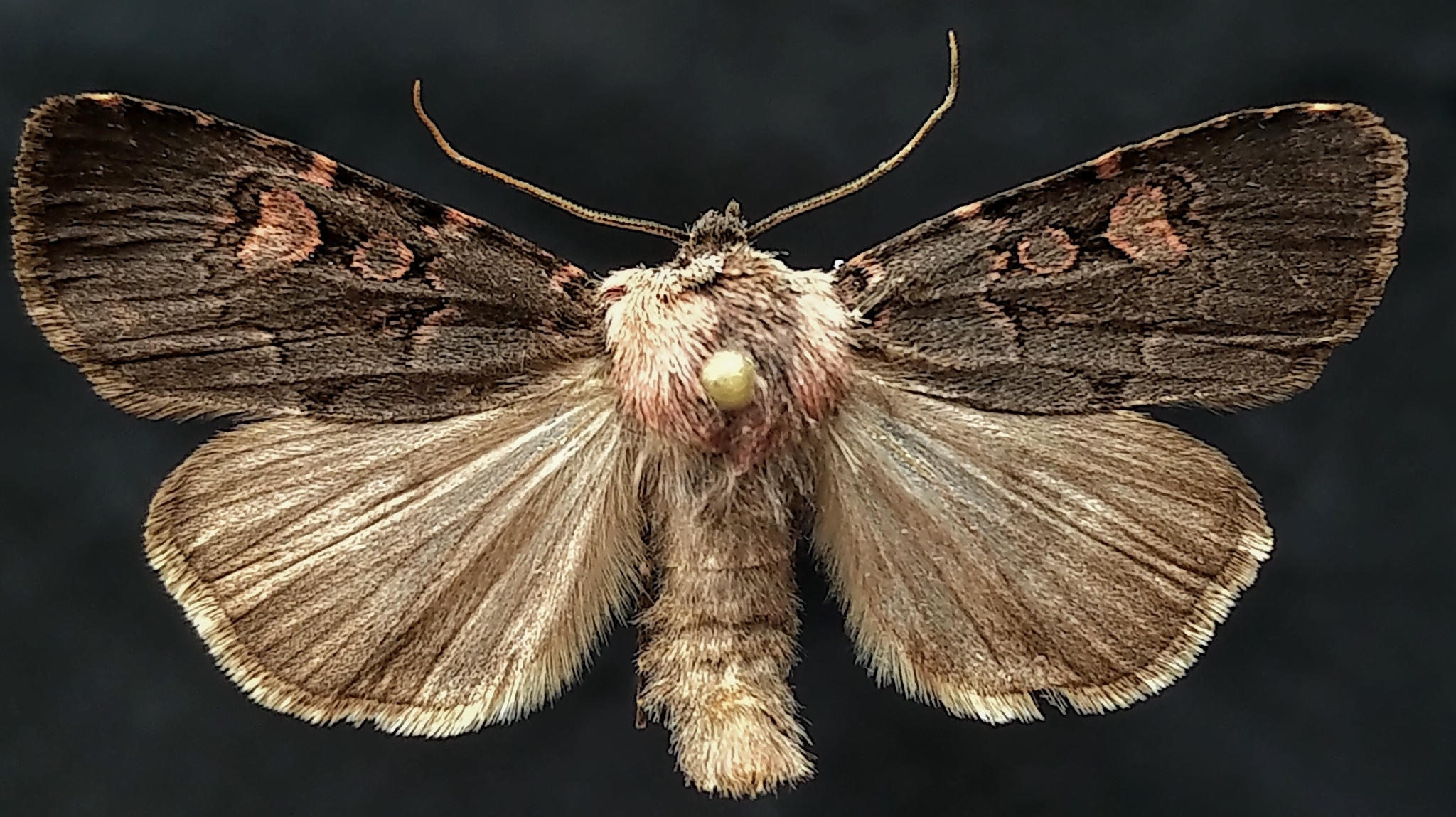

Scientific classification
- Domain: Eukaryota
- Kingdom: Animalia
- Phylum: Arthropoda
- Class: Insecta
- Order: Lepidoptera
- Superfamily: Noctuoidea
- Family: Noctuidae
- Genus: Feltia
- Species: F. nigrita

Binomial name
- Feltia nigrita (Graeser, 1892)

Synonyms
- List: Agrotis nigrita Graeser, 1892; Euxoa nigrita (Graeser, 1892); Trichosilia nigrita (Graeser, 1892); Feltia (Trichosilia) nigrita (Graeser, 1892); Trichosilia grisea Kozhantshikov, 1935; Feltia acarnea (Smith, 1905); Trichosilia acarnea (Smith, 1905)

= Feltia nigrita =

Species of moth

Feltia nigrita is a species of moth in the family Noctuidae first described by Ludwig Carl Friedrich Graeser in 1892. It is found in Russia (Siberia, central Yakutia, the Amur and Primorye regions) and Canada (British Columbia, Alberta, Saskatchewan, Yukon and Manitoba).
