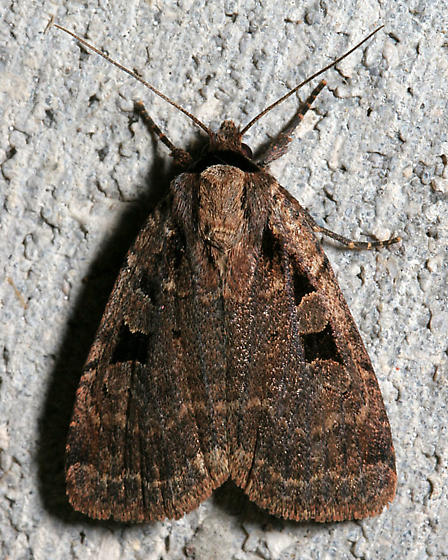

Scientific classification
- Kingdom: Animalia
- Phylum: Arthropoda
- Class: Insecta
- Order: Lepidoptera
- Superfamily: Noctuoidea
- Family: Noctuidae
- Genus: Eueretagrotis
- Species: E. perattentus

Binomial name
- Eueretagrotis perattentus (Grote, 1876)

Synonyms
- Eueretagrotis perattenta; Eueretagrotis perattenta inattenta

= Eueretagrotis perattentus =

Species of moth

Eueretagrotis perattentus, the two-spot dart, is a moth of the family Noctuidae. It is found from coast to coast across central and southern Canada, and in the northern United States, south along the Appalachians to western North Carolina and Tennessee.

The wingspan is about 32 mm. Adults are on wing from June to July.

Larvae have been reared on Vaccinium and Prunus pennsylvanica.
