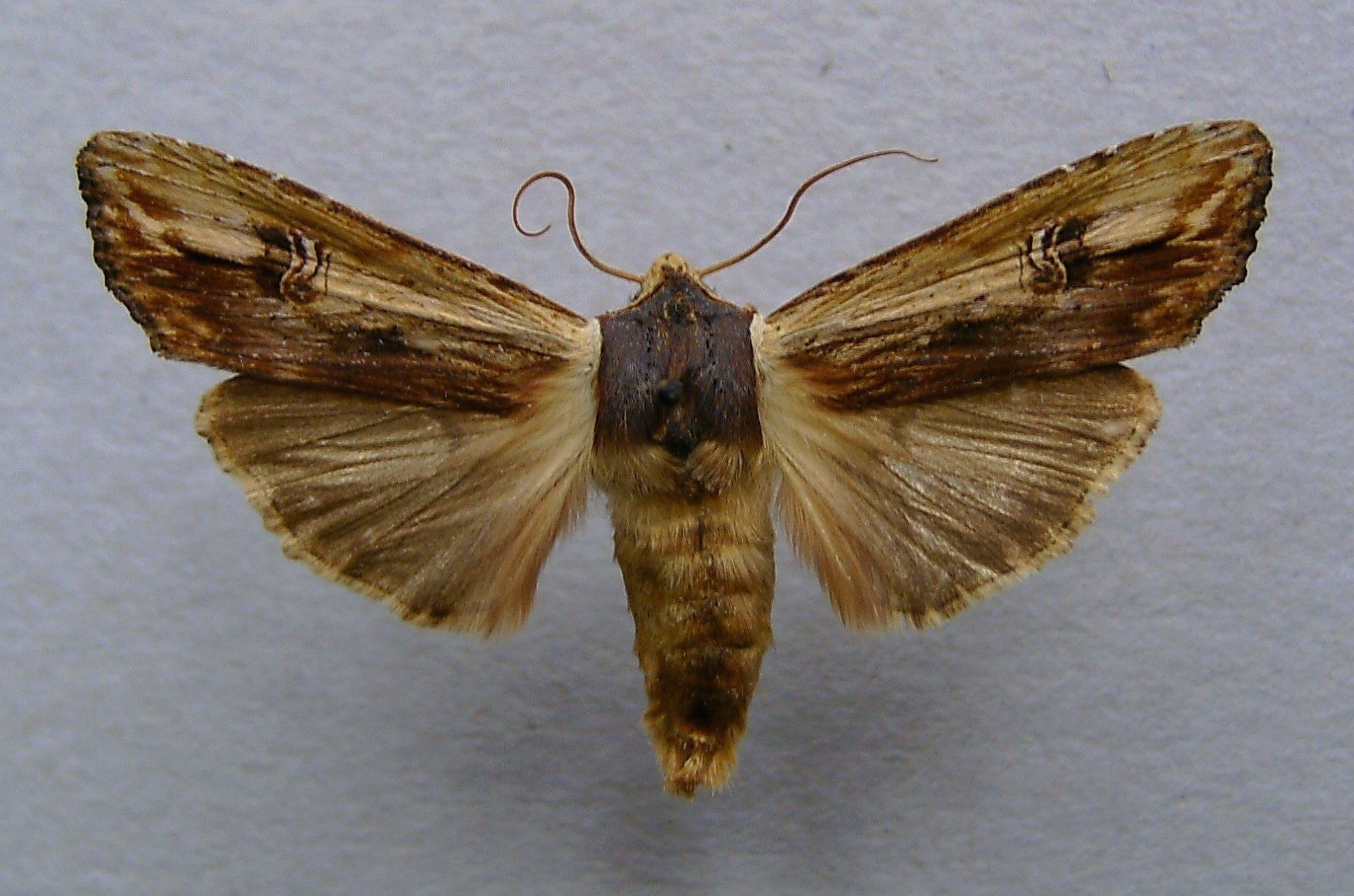

Scientific classification
- Kingdom: Animalia
- Phylum: Arthropoda
- Class: Insecta
- Order: Lepidoptera
- Superfamily: Noctuoidea
- Family: Noctuidae
- Genus: Xylena
- Species: X. vetusta

Binomial name
- Xylena vetusta (Hübner, 1813)

Synonyms
- Calocampa vetusta; Xylina vetusta

= Xylena vetusta =

Species of moth

Xylena vetusta, the red sword-grass, is a moth of the family Noctuidae. The species was first described by Jacob Hübner in 1813. It is found in the Palearctic realm from northwestern Africa through Europe and Asia up to central Siberia. In the north it is found up to the Arctic Circle and Iceland.

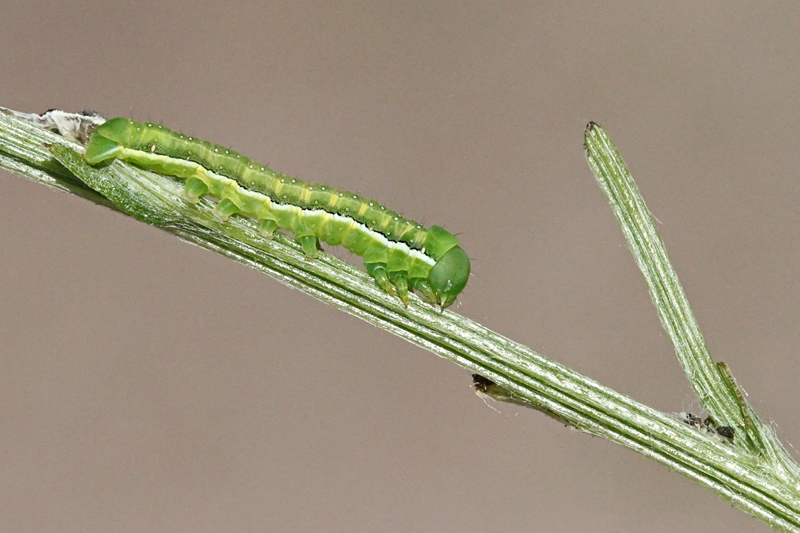
Larva

== Technical description and variation ==
The wingspan is 52–65 mm and the forewings are long and narrow. Their colouring is pale greyish ochreous, the inner marginal half suffused with fuscous or blackish brown, less strongly beyond middle; orbicular stigma obsolescent, marked by a brown dot or two, rarely outlined; reniform large, pale, with double brown outline, followed by a patch of brown scaling, joined by a black brown sagittate mark to the pale serrate subterminal line; a diffuse black blotch in the dark scaling represents the claviform stigma; lines very indistinct, indicated by dark vein spots; hindwing brownish fuscous. In the ab. albida Spul. a diffuse streak of white scales runs from the base along the middle of wing extending to the space below the reniform and obliquely upwards to apex; in the females the dark markings are more mixed with blackish grey and in the males with brown; in ab. brunnea Tutt the ground colour is brighter ochreous, and the dark shading brown or black brown, the grey and white scaling being altogether absent.

== Biology ==
Adults are on wing from August to June.

Larva bright green or olive brown; dorsal and subdorsal lines yellowish, the latter with three yellow tubercles above them on each segment; spiracular line yellow, black edged above, with the spiracles red. The larvae feed on various plants, including Rumex hydrolapathum, Centaurea, Iris, Cyperaceae and Polygonum.
