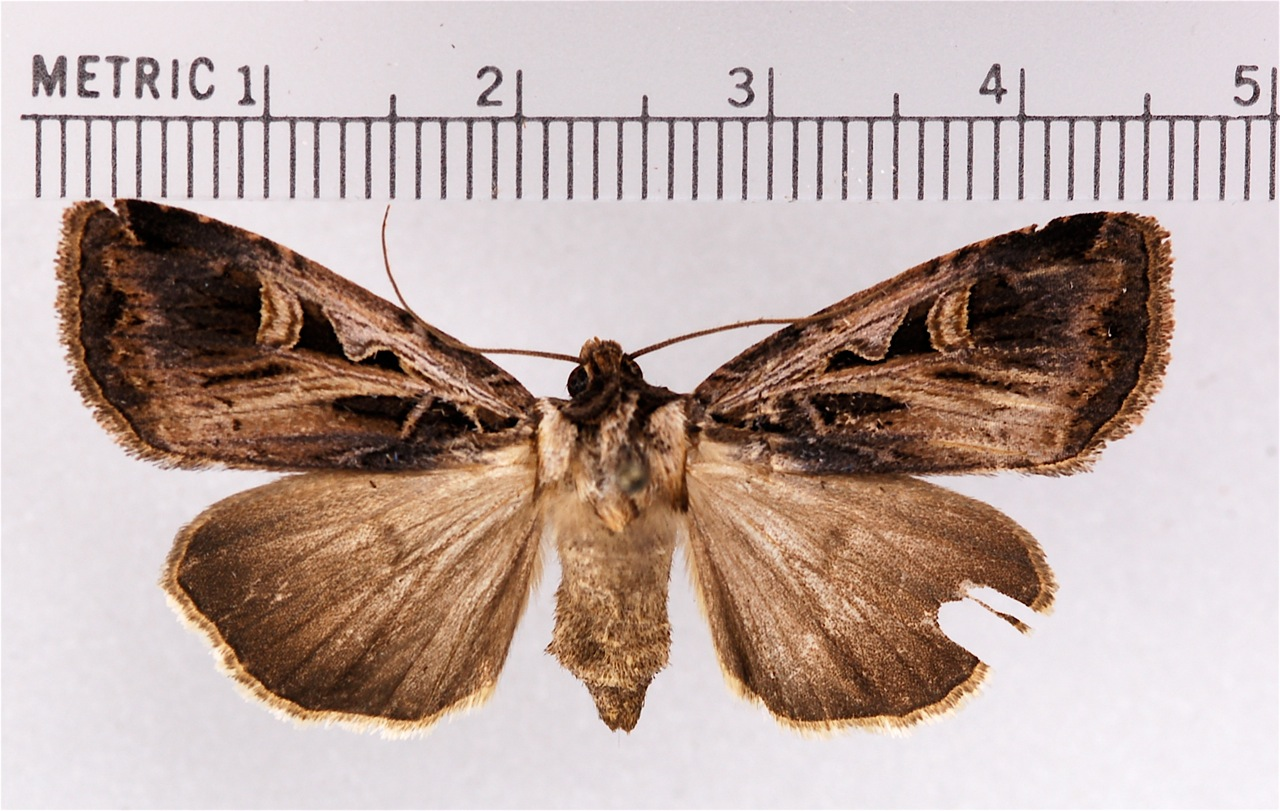
- 12 September 2002, Myersville, MD

Scientific classification
- Kingdom: Animalia
- Phylum: Arthropoda
- Clade: Pancrustacea
- Class: Insecta
- Order: Lepidoptera
- Superfamily: Noctuoidea
- Family: Noctuidae
- Genus: Feltia
- Species: F. subgothica

Binomial name
- Feltia subgothica (Haworth, 1809)

= Feltia subgothica =

Species of moth

Feltia subgothica, the gothic dart or subgothic dart, is a moth of the family Noctuidae. It is found in central North America, north to Quebec, Ontario and Saskatchewan.

The wingspan is about 34 mm. Adults are on wing from July to September.

Larvae have been reported from over 40 plant species including crops, forages, vegetables and forbs.
