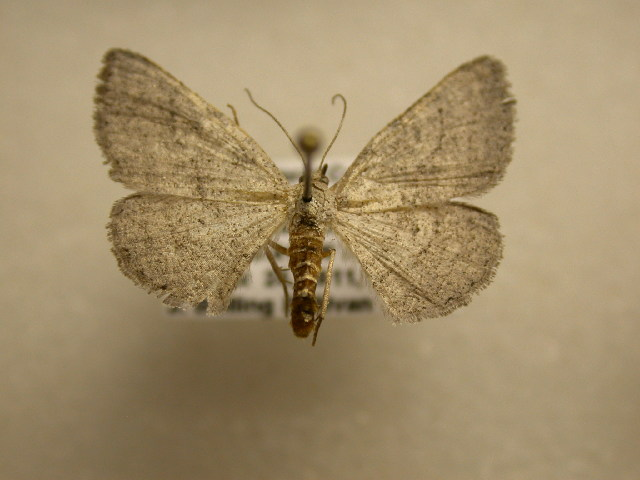

Scientific classification
- Kingdom: Animalia
- Phylum: Arthropoda
- Clade: Pancrustacea
- Class: Insecta
- Order: Lepidoptera
- Family: Geometridae
- Genus: Glena
- Species: G. cognataria

Binomial name
- Glena cognataria (Hübner, 1824-31)

Synonyms
- Anagoga cognataria Hubner, 1831; Aspilates acidaliaria Walker, 1863; Diastictis crassata Hulst, 1896; Aspilates inflexaria Walker, 1863; Selidosema insaria Dyar, 1909; Selidosema muricolor Hulst, 1896; Anisodes umatillaria Strecker, 1899

= Glena cognataria =

Species of moth

Glena cognataria, the blueberry gray moth, is a moth native to North America. It ranges from Florida to Nova Scotia and New Brunswick. Its larvae are hosted on blueberry. The habitat consists of bogs and pine barrens. It is listed as a species of special concern and believed extirpated in the US state of Connecticut.

The length of the forewings is about 13–15 mm.

The larvae have been recorded feeding on blueberry, as well as many hardwood species including oak, maple, cherry, willow and poplar.
