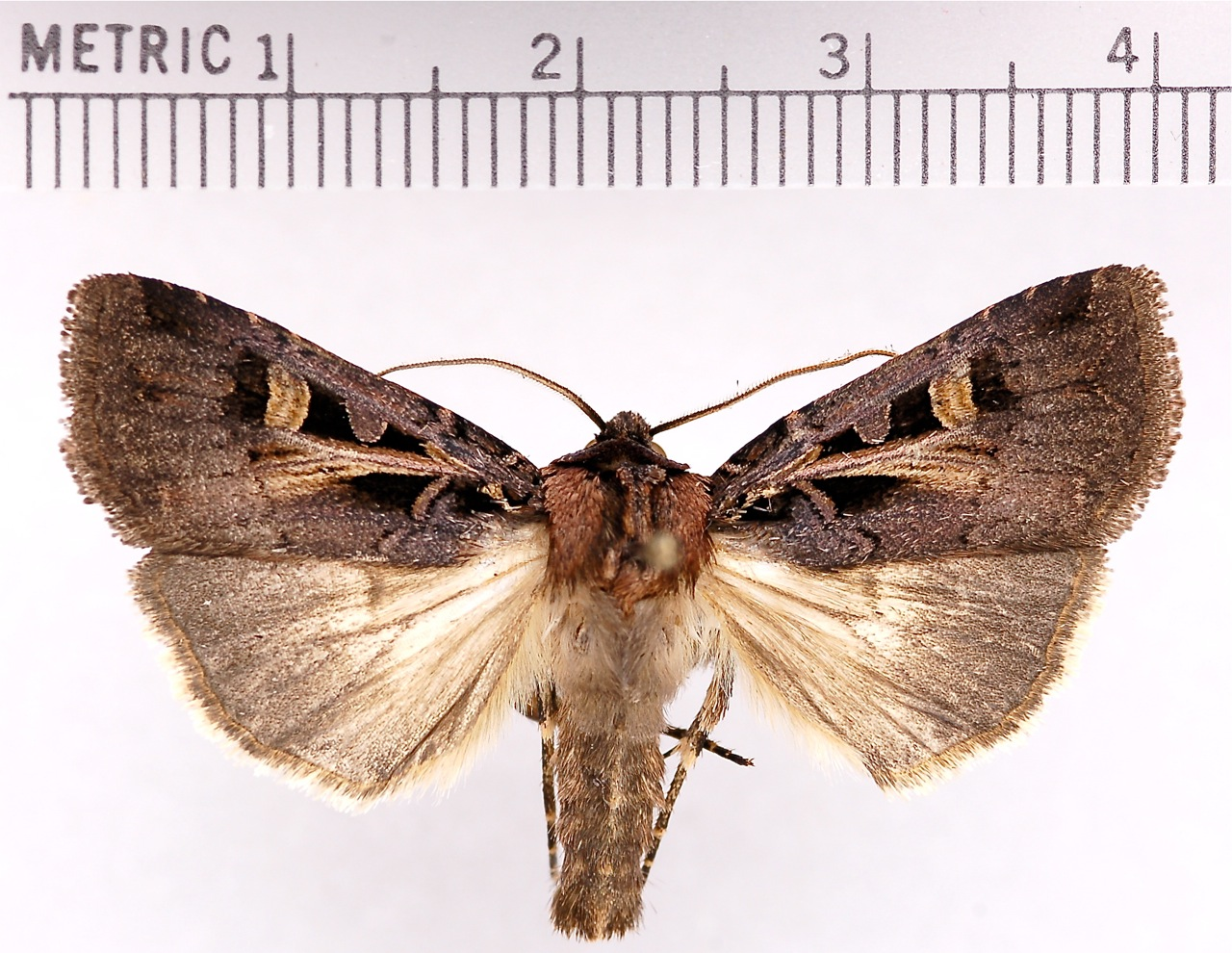

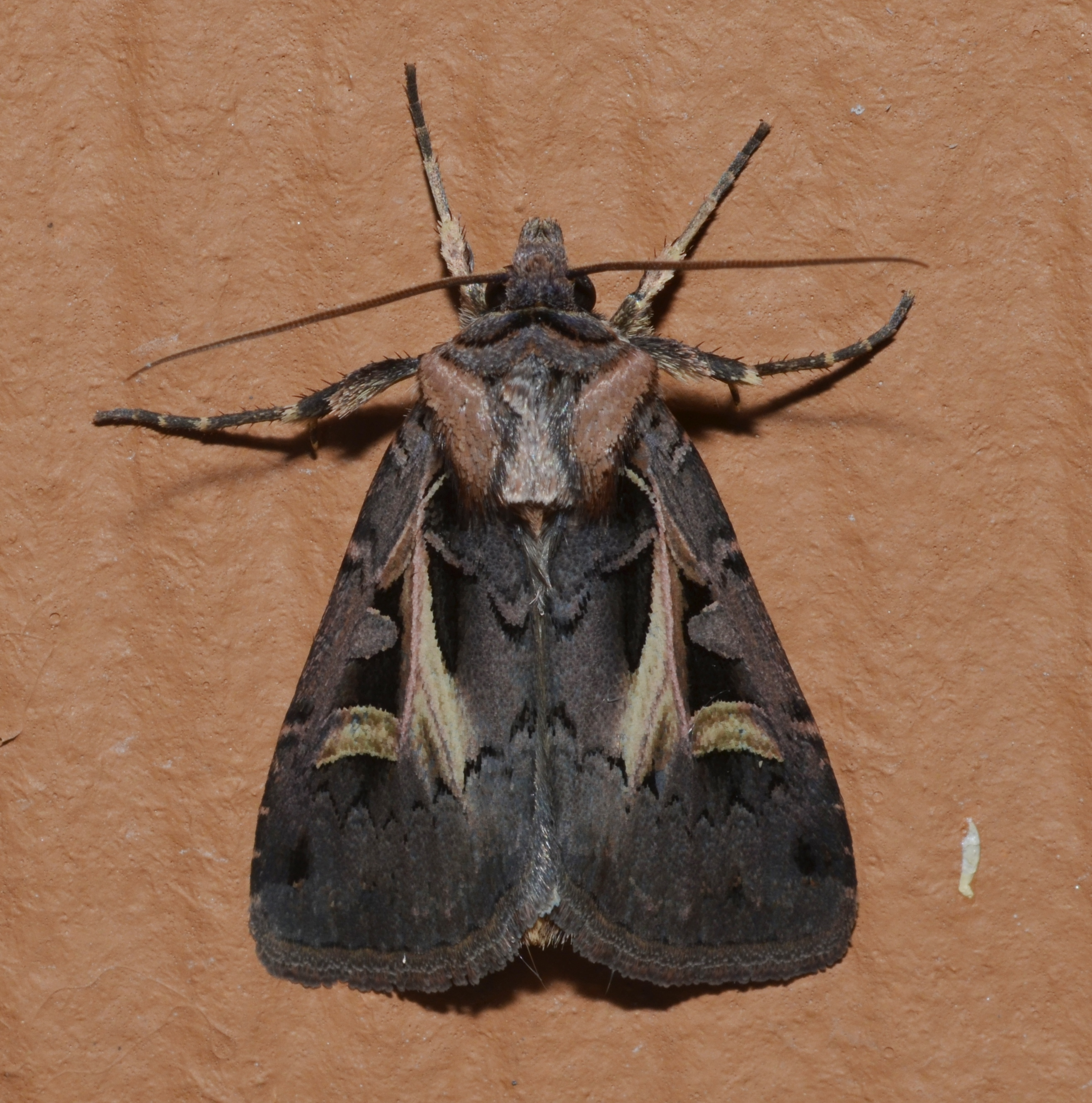

Scientific classification
- Kingdom: Animalia
- Phylum: Arthropoda
- Class: Insecta
- Order: Lepidoptera
- Superfamily: Noctuoidea
- Family: Noctuidae
- Genus: Feltia
- Species: F. herilis

Binomial name
- Feltia herilis (Grote, 1873)

= Feltia herilis =

Species of moth

Feltia herilis, the herald dart or Master's dart, is a moth of the family Noctuidae. The species was first described by Augustus Radcliffe Grote in 1873. It is found in North America from Vancouver Island to Newfoundland, north to the Northwest Territories border and south to the Gulf Coast.

The wingspan is 34–44 mm. Adults are on wing from July to October. There is one generation per year.

The larvae feed on a wide variety of plants, including crops, forages, vegetables, forbs and herbs. Adults have been reported to feed on nectar, with one report on Liatris.
