= Xylena cineritia =

Scientific classification
- Kingdom: Animalia
- Phylum: Arthropoda
- Class: Insecta
- Order: Lepidoptera
- Superfamily: Noctuoidea
- Family: Noctuidae
- Genus: Xylena
- Species: X. cineritia

Binomial name
- Xylena cineritia (Grote, 1875)

Species of moth

Xylena cineritia, the gray swordgrass moth, is a species of cutworm or dart moth in the family Noctuidae. It is found in northern North America, from New Jersey to Newfoundland and from California to British Columbia.

It eats alder, birch, blueberry, Buffaloberry (Shepherdia canadensis), elder (Sambucus spp.), maple, meadowsweet, oak, poplar, rose, and willow.

The MONA or Hodges number for Xylena cineritia is 9876.
