= Feltia tricosa =

Scientific classification
- Domain: Eukaryota
- Kingdom: Animalia
- Phylum: Arthropoda
- Class: Insecta
- Order: Lepidoptera
- Superfamily: Noctuoidea
- Family: Noctuidae
- Genus: Feltia
- Species: F. tricosa

Binomial name
- Feltia tricosa (Lintner, 1874)

Synonyms
- Feltia pectinicornis J.B. Smith, 1890; Feltia subpallida McDunnough, 1932

Species of moth

Feltia tricosa, the tricose dart, is a moth of the family Noctuidae. It is found in central North America, north to Quebec, Ontario and Manitoba.

The wingspan is about 35 mm. Adults are on wing from July to September in the north.

The larvae probably feed on a wide variety of plants.
