= List of moths of Australia (Carposinidae) =

Partial list of Australian moths

This is a list of the Australian species of the family Carposinidae. It also acts as an index to the species articles and forms part of the full List of moths of Australia.

- Bondia attenuatana Meyrick, 1882
- Bondia caseata Meyrick, 1910
- Bondia digramma Meyrick, 1910
- Bondia dissolutana Meyrick, 1882
- Bondia maleficana Meyrick, 1882
- Bondia nigella Newman, 1856
- Carposina autologa Meyrick, 1910
- Carposina chaetolopha Turner, 1926
- Carposina hyperlopha Turner, 1947
- Carposina latebrosa Meyrick, 1910
- Carposina leptoneura Meyrick, 1920
- Carposina loxolopha Turner, 1947
- Carposina mediella (Walker, 1866)
- Carposina mimodes Meyrick, 1910
- Carposina nesolocha Meyrick, 1910
- Carposina neurophorella (Meyrick, 1879)
- Carposina orphania Meyrick, 1910
- Carposina perileuca (Lower, 1908)
- Carposina petraea Meyrick, 1910
- Carposina phaeochyta (Turner, 1946)
- Carposina pinarodes Meyrick, 1910
- Carposina poliosticha Turner, 1947
- Carposina smaragdias Turner, 1916
- Carposina tanaoptera Turner, 1947
- Carposina taractis Meyrick, 1910
- Carposina telesia Meyrick, 1910
- Coscinoptycha improbana Meyrick, 1881
- Epicopistis pleurospila Turner, 1933
- Meridarchis zymota Meyrick, 1910
- Paramorpha aplegia (Turner, 1916)
- Paramorpha aquilana Meyrick, 1881
- Paramorpha cylindrica Meyrick, 1921
- Paramorpha eburneola Turner, 1927
- Paramorpha hapalopis Meyrick, 1910
- Paramorpha injusta Meyrick, 1913
- Paramorpha rhachias Meyrick, 1910
- Paramorpha semotheta Meyrick, 1910
- Paramorpha tenuistria Turner, 1947
- Sosineura mimica (Lower, 1893)
