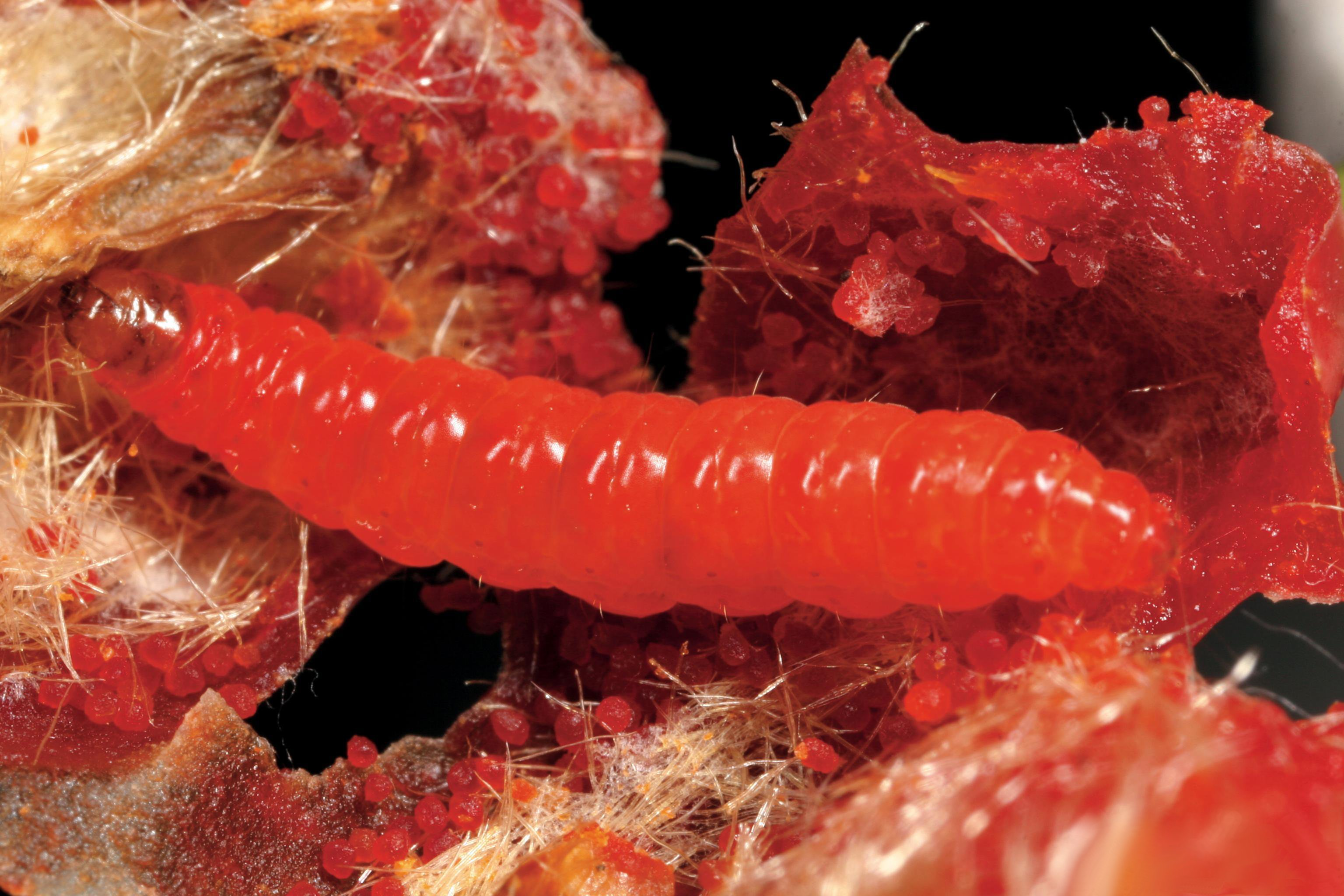
- Carposina scirrhosella larva

Scientific classification
- Kingdom: Animalia
- Phylum: Arthropoda
- Class: Insecta
- Order: Lepidoptera
- Family: Carposinidae
- Genus: Carposina; Herrich-Schäffer, 1853

Synonyms
- Oistophora Meyrick, 1881; Trepsitypa Meyrick, 1913; Dipremna Davis, 1969; Enopa Walker, 1866; Epipremna Davis, 1969; Heterocrossa Meyrick, 1882; Hypopremna Davis, 1969

= Carposina =

Genus of moths

Carposina is a genus of moths in the Carposinidae family.

== Species ==
- Carposina achroana Meyrick, 1883
- Carposina altivaga Meyrick, 1925
- Carposina apousia Clarke, 1971
- Carposina asbolopis Meyrick, 1928
- Carposina askoldana Diakonoff, 1989
- Carposina atlanticella Rebel, 1894
- Carposina atronotata Walsingham, 1907
- Carposina autologa Meyrick, 1910
- Carposina benigna Meyrick, 1913
- Carposina berberidella Herrich-Schäffer, 1855
- Carposina bicincta Walsingham, 1907
- Carposina biloba Davis, 1969
- Carposina brachycentra Meyrick, 1914
- Carposina bullata Meyrick, 1913
- Carposina candace Meyrick, 1932
- Carposina capnarcha (Meyrick, 1938) (originally in Meridarchis)
- Carposina carcinopa Meyrick, 1927
- Carposina cardinata (Meyrick, 1913) (originally in Trepsitypa)
- Carposina cervinella Walsingham, 1907
- Carposina chaetolopha Turner, 1926
- Carposina chersodes Meyrick, 1915
- Carposina conobathra Meyrick, 1928
- Carposina coreana Kim, 1955
  - =Carposina cornusvora (Yang, 1982) (originally in Asiacarposina)
- Carposina corticella Walsingham, 1907
  - =Carposina latifasciata Walsingham, 1907
  - =Carposina semitogata Walsingham, 1907
- Carposina cretata Davis, 1969
- Carposina crinifera Walsingham, 1907
- Carposina crypsichola Meyrick, 1910
- Carposina dascioptera Turner, 1947
- Carposina diampyx Diakonoff, 1989
- Carposina dispar Walsingham, 1907
- Carposina distincta Walsingham, 1907
- Carposina divaricata Walsingham, 1907
- Carposina dominicae Davis, 1969
- Carposina ekbatana Amsel, 1978
- Carposina engalactis Meyrick, 1932
- Carposina euphanes Bradley, 1956
- Carposina euschema Bradley, 1965
- Carposina exsanguis Meyrick, 1918
- Carposina fernaldana Busck, 1907
- Carposina ferruginea Walsingham, 1907
- Carposina gemmata Walsingham, 1907
- Carposina gigantella Rebel, 1917
- Carposina glauca Meyrick, 1913
- Carposina gracillima Walsingham, 1907
- Carposina graminicolor Walsingham, 1907
- Carposina graminis Walsingham, 1907
- Carposina herbarum Walsingham, 1907
- Carposina hercotis Meyrick, 1913
- Carposina hyperlopha Turner, 1947
  - =Carposina poliosticha Turner, 1947
- Carposina impavida Meyrick, 1913
- Carposina inscripta Walsingham, 1907
- Carposina irata Meyrick, 1914
- Carposina irrorata Walsingham, 1907
- Carposina lacerata Meyrick, 1913
- Carposina latebrosa Meyrick, 1910
- Carposina lembula (Meyrick, 1910) (originally in Meridarchis)
  - =Carposina hylactica (Meyrick, 1938) (originally in Meridarchis)
- Carposina leptoneura Meyrick, 1920
- Carposina longipalpalis Mey, 2007
- Carposina loxolopha Turner, 1947
- Carposina maritima Ponomarenko, 1999
- Carposina mauii Walsingham, 1907
- Carposina mediella Walker, 1866 (originally in Enopa)
  - =Carposina ceramophanes Turner, 1947
  - =Carposina pterocosmana Meyrick, 1881
- Carposina megalosema Diakonoff, 1949
- Carposina mesophaea Bradley, 1965
- Carposina mesospila Meyrick, 1920
- Carposina mimodes Meyrick, 1910
- Carposina mnia Diakonoff, 1954
- Carposina nereitis Meyrick, 1913
- Carposina nesolocha Meyrick, 1910
- Carposina neurophorella Meyrick, 1879
- Carposina nigromaculata Walsingham, 1907
- Carposina nigronotata Walsingham, 1907
- Carposina niponensis Walsingham, 1900 (peach fruit moth)
- Carposina olbiodora Turner, 1947
- Carposina olivaceonitens Walsingham, 1907
- Carposina orphania Meyrick, 1910
- Carposina ottawana Kearfott, 1907
- Carposina paracrinifera Clarke, 1971
- Carposina perileuca Lower, 1908
- Carposina petraea Meyrick, 1910
  - =Carposina eulopha Turner, 1916
- Carposina phycitana Walsingham, 1914
- Carposina pinarodes Meyrick, 1910
- Carposina piperatella Walsingham, 1907
- Carposina plumbeonitida Walsingham, 1907
- Carposina poliophara Bradley, 1965
- Carposina proconsularis Meyrick, 1921
- Carposina punctulata Walsingham, 1907
- Carposina pusilla Walsingham, 1907
- Carposina pygmaeella Walsingham, 1907
- Carposina roesleri Amsel, 1977
- Carposina rosella Kuznetsov, 1975
- Carposina sasakii Matsumura, 1900
  - =Carposina nicholsana Forbes, 1923
  - =Carposina percicana Matsumura, 1899
- Carposina saurates Meyrick, 1913
- Carposina scierotoxa Meyrick, 1924
- Carposina scirrhosella Herrich-Schäffer, 1855
  - =Carposina orientella Staniou & Nemes, 1968
- Carposina simulator Davis, 1969
- Carposina siturga Meyrick, 1912
- Carposina smaragdias Turner, 1916
- Carposina socors Meyrick, 1928
- Carposina solutella Walsingham, 1907
- Carposina stationaria Meyrick, 1928
- Carposina subolivacea Walsingham, 1907
- Carposina subselliata Meyrick, 1921
- Carposina subumbrata Walsingham, 1907
- Carposina tanaoptera Turner, 1947
- Carposina taractis Meyrick, 1910
- Carposina telesia Meyrick, 1910
- Carposina tetratoma Diakonoff, 1989
- Carposina thermurga Meyrick, 1929
  - =Carposina ferruginea Meyrick, 1925
- Carposina tincta Walsingham, 1907
- Carposina togata Walsingham, 1907
- Carposina trigononotata Walsingham, 1907
- Carposina viduana Caradja, 1916
- Carposina viridis Walsingham, 1907
- Carposina zymota Meyrick, 1910 (originally in Meridarchis)

== Former species ==
- Carposina aplegia Turner, 1916
- Carposina euryleuca Meyrick, 1912
  - =Carposina comonana Kearfott, 1907
- Carposina sysciodes Turner, 1947
