= C. petraea =

C. petraea may refer to one of the following species:

- Caradrina petraea, a moth species native to Eastern Europe
- Carposina petraea, a moth species found in Australia
- Coleophora petraea, a moth species found in Uzbekistan
- Cycas petraea, a cycad species
