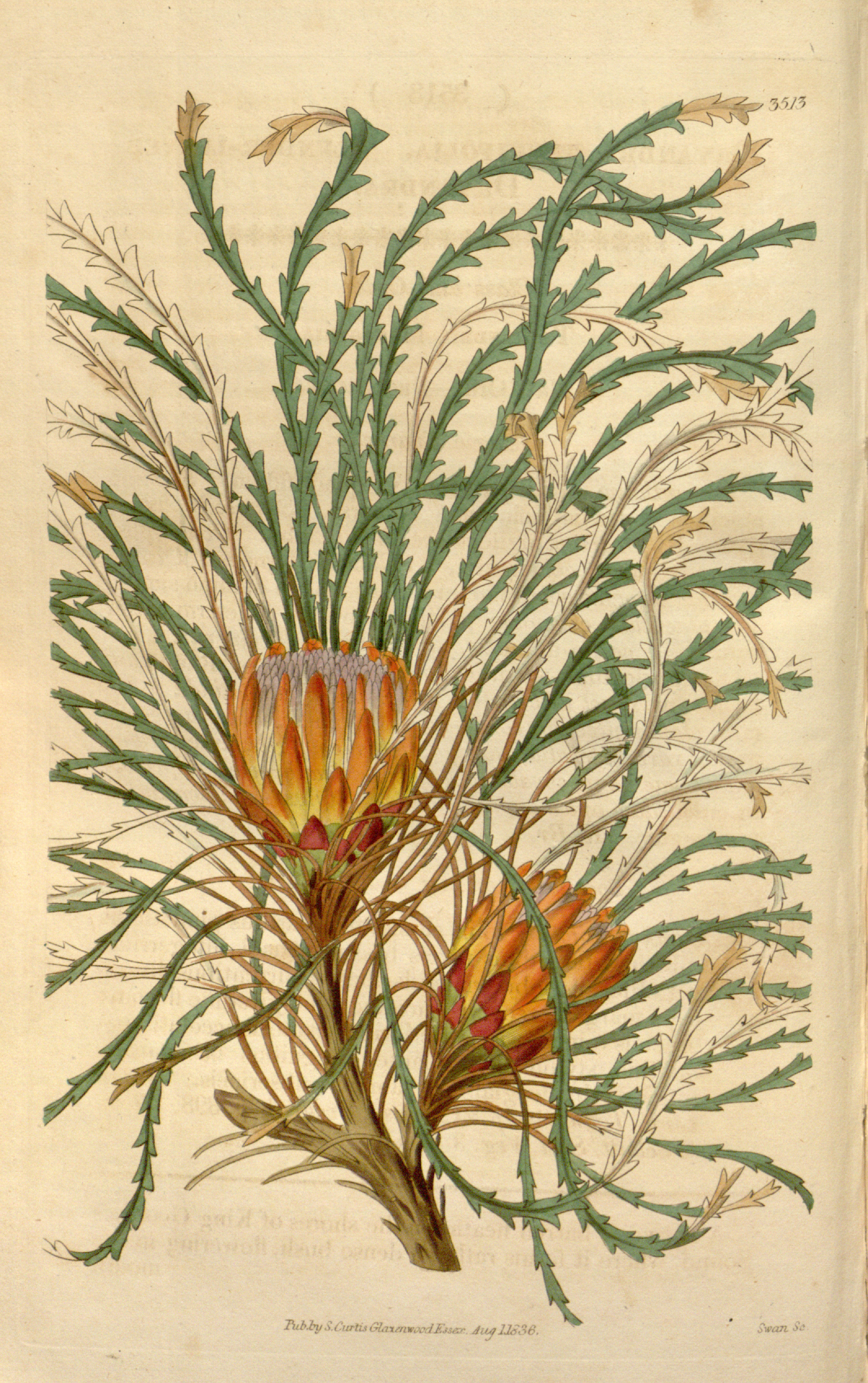
- Illustration from Curtis's Botanical Magazine

Scientific classification
- Kingdom: Plantae
- Clade: Tracheophytes
- Clade: Angiosperms
- Clade: Eudicots
- Order: Proteales
- Family: Proteaceae
- Genus: Banksia
- Subgenus: Banksia subg. Banksia
- Series: Banksia ser. Dryandra
- Species: B. tenuis

Binomial name
- Banksia tenuis A.R.Mast and K.R.Thiele

Synonyms
- Dryandra tenuifolia R.Br.; Dryandra uncata A.Cunn. ex Lehm. nom. inval., pro syn.; Josephia tenuifolia (R.Br.) Poir.; Josephia tenuifolia (R.Br.) Kuntze isonym

= Banksia tenuis =

Species of shrub endemic to Western Australia

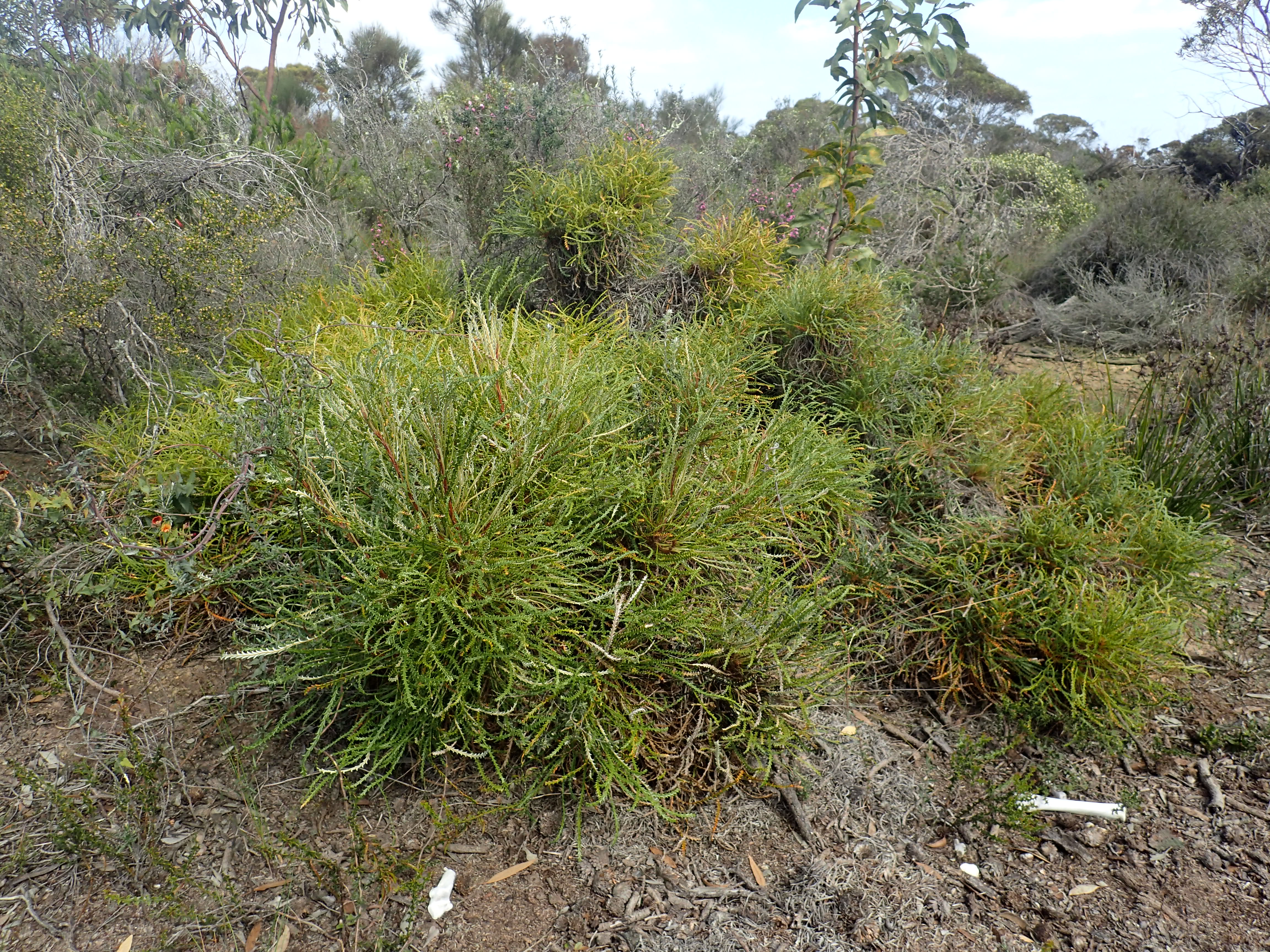
Habit near Jerramungup

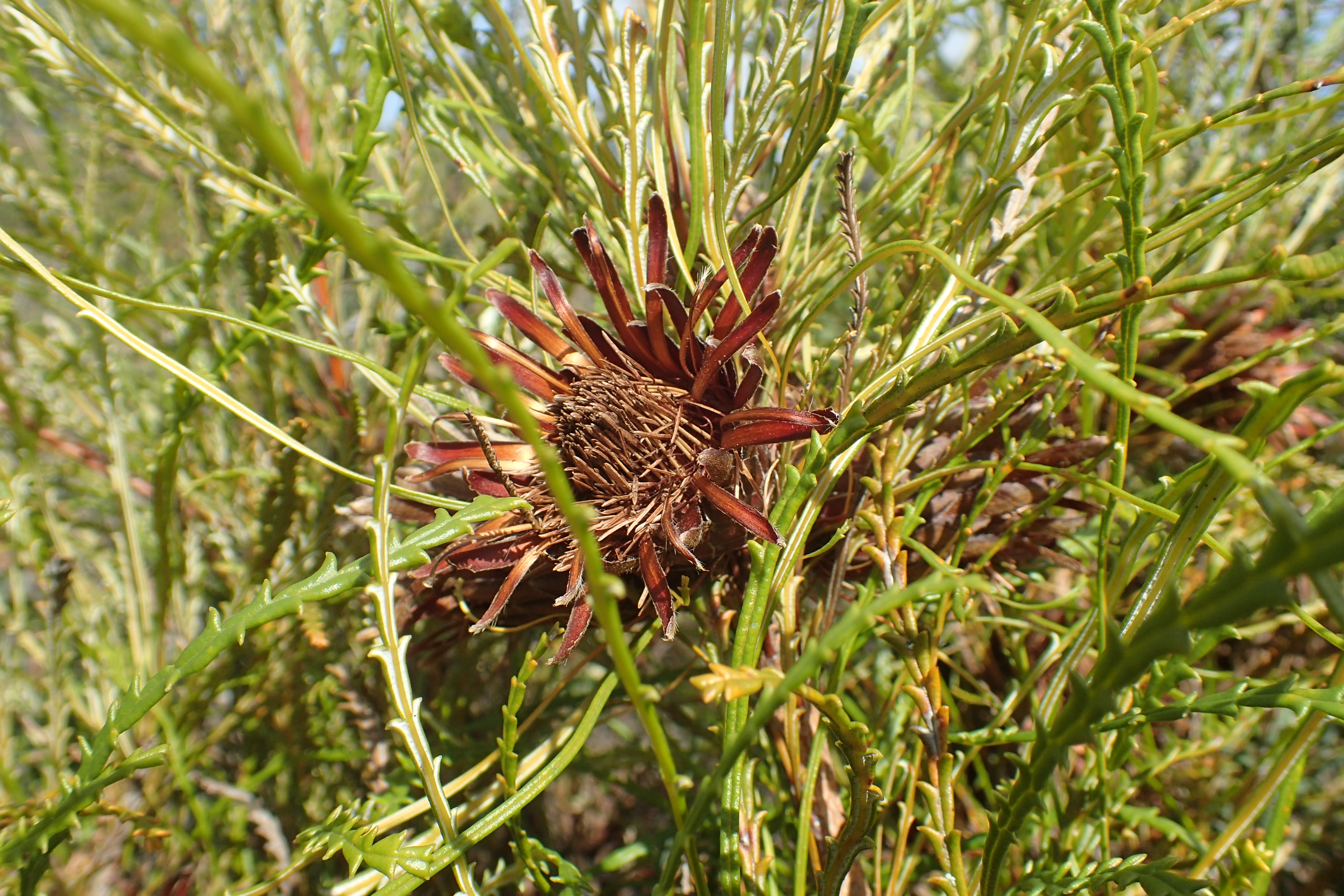
Spent flowers

Banksia tenuis is a species of shrub that is endemic to the southwest of Western Australia. It has pinnatifid, serrated or smooth-edges leaves, golden brown and cream-coloured flowers in heads of about fifty-five and glabrous, egg-shaped follicles.

== Description ==
Banksia tenuis is a shrub that typically grows to a height of 1.5 m (4 ft 11 in) or is a mat-like shrub spreading to 3 m (9.8 ft) wide, but it does not form a lignotuber. The leaves are linear in outline, 60–260 mm (2.4–10.2 in) long and 2–5 mm (0.079–0.197 in) wide on a petiole up to 50 mm (2.0 in) long. The leaves are curved or bent, sometimes pinnatifid or serrated with up to twenty teeth on each side, or with smooth edges. The flowers are golden brown and cream-coloured and arranged in heads of between forty-five and sixty-five with reddish brown, egg-shaped to oblong involucral bracts 40–45 mm (1.6–1.8 in) long at the base of the head. The perianth is 27–33 mm (1.1–1.3 in) long and the pistil 23–31 mm (0.91–1.22 in) long. Flowering occurs from March to July and the fruit is a glabrous, egg-shaped follicle 14–17 mm (0.55–0.67 in) long.

== Taxonomy and naming ==
This species was first formally described in 1810 by Robert Brown who gave it the name Dryandra tenuifolia and published the description in the Transactions of the Linnean Society of London.

In 1996, Alex George described two varieties of Dryandra tenuifolia:

- Dryandra tenuifolia var. reptans, a more or less prostrate shrub with leaves that are smooth-edged, or only serrated near the tip;
- Dryandra tenuifolia var. tenuifolia, a bushy, more or less erect shrub with leaves that are pinnatifid or serrated for at least most of their length.

In 2007 all Dryandra species were transferred to Banksia by Austin Mast and Kevin Thiele, and this species became Banksia tenuis and the varieties reptans and tenuis respectively. As the name Banksia tenuifolia had already been published in reference to the plant now known as Hakea sericea (needlebush), Mast and Thiele had to choose a new specific epithet; their choice, "tenuis", retains the original names' use of the Latin tenuis ("thin"), in reference to the narrow leaves.

== Distribution and habitat ==
Banksia tenuis grows in kwongan and is widespread between Darkan, Williams and the Cape Arid National Park. The autonym, var. tenuis is found between Kamballup in the Stirling Range National Park and Cape Arid, and var. reptans between Darkan, Williams and Jerramungup.

== Ecology ==
An assessment of the potential impact of climate change on this species found that its range is likely to contract by between 30% and 80% by 2080, depending on the severity of the change.

== Conservation status ==
Banksia tenuis and both varieties of the species are classified as "not threatened" by the Western Australian Government Department of Parks and Wildlife.
