= Carposina viduana =

Scientific classification
- Kingdom: Animalia
- Phylum: Arthropoda
- Clade: Pancrustacea
- Class: Insecta
- Order: Lepidoptera
- Family: Carposinidae
- Genus: Carposina
- Species: C. viduana

Binomial name
- Carposina viduana Caradja, 1916

Synonyms
- Carposina sasakii f. viduana

Species of moth

Carposina viduana is a moth in the Carposinidae family. It was described by Aristide Caradja in 1916. It is found in Russia (Khabarovskii krai, Primorskii krai).

The wingspan is 15–19 mm.

== Taxonomy ==
This species was considered a form of Carposina sasakii by Alexey Diakonoff in 1989, but reinstated as a species in 2009.
