= Carposina stationaria =

Scientific classification
- Kingdom: Animalia
- Phylum: Arthropoda
- Clade: Pancrustacea
- Class: Insecta
- Order: Lepidoptera
- Family: Carposinidae
- Genus: Carposina
- Species: C. stationaria

Binomial name
- Carposina stationaria Meyrick, 1928

Species of moth

Carposina stationaria is a moth in the family Carposinidae. It was described by Edward Meyrick in 1928. It is found in Vanuatu on the New Hebrides.
