= Carposina gigantella =

Scientific classification
- Kingdom: Animalia
- Phylum: Arthropoda
- Clade: Pancrustacea
- Class: Insecta
- Order: Lepidoptera
- Family: Carposinidae
- Genus: Carposina
- Species: C. gigantella

Binomial name
- Carposina gigantella Rebel, 1917

Species of moth

Carposina gigantella is a moth in the Carposinidae family. It is found on the Canary Islands.

The wingspan is about 25 mm. The forewings are mixed whitish grey and brown. The hindwings are grey.
