= Carposina phycitana =

Scientific classification
- Kingdom: Animalia
- Phylum: Arthropoda
- Clade: Pancrustacea
- Class: Insecta
- Order: Lepidoptera
- Family: Carposinidae
- Genus: Carposina
- Species: C. phycitana

Binomial name
- Carposina phycitana Walsingham, 1914

Species of moth

Carposina phycitana is a moth in the Carposinidae family. It was described by Walsingham in 1914. It is found in Panama.
