= Carposina candace =

Scientific classification
- Kingdom: Animalia
- Phylum: Arthropoda
- Clade: Pancrustacea
- Class: Insecta
- Order: Lepidoptera
- Family: Carposinidae
- Genus: Carposina
- Species: C. candace

Binomial name
- Carposina candace Meyrick, 1932

Species of moth

Carposina candace is a moth in the family Carposinidae. It was described by Edward Meyrick in 1932. It is found in Ethiopia.
