= Carposina cretata =

Scientific classification
- Kingdom: Animalia
- Phylum: Arthropoda
- Clade: Pancrustacea
- Class: Insecta
- Order: Lepidoptera
- Family: Carposinidae
- Genus: Carposina
- Species: C. cretata

Binomial name
- Carposina cretata Davis, 1969

Species of moth

Carposina cretata is a moth in the Carposinidae family. It is found in Puerto Rico.
