= Carposina biloba =

Scientific classification
- Kingdom: Animalia
- Phylum: Arthropoda
- Clade: Pancrustacea
- Class: Insecta
- Order: Lepidoptera
- Family: Carposinidae
- Genus: Carposina
- Species: C. biloba

Binomial name
- Carposina biloba Davis, 1969

Species of moth

Carposina biloba is a moth in the Carposinidae family. It was described by Davis in 1969. It is found in North America, where it has been recorded from Florida and South Carolina.

Adults have been recorded on wing in July and from September to October.
