= Carposina dominicae =

Scientific classification
- Kingdom: Animalia
- Phylum: Arthropoda
- Clade: Pancrustacea
- Class: Insecta
- Order: Lepidoptera
- Family: Carposinidae
- Genus: Carposina
- Species: C. dominicae

Binomial name
- Carposina dominicae Davis, 1969

Species of moth

Carposina dominicae is a moth in the Carposinidae family. It was described by Davis in 1969. It is found on Dominica.
