= Carposina chersodes =

Scientific classification
- Kingdom: Animalia
- Phylum: Arthropoda
- Clade: Pancrustacea
- Class: Insecta
- Order: Lepidoptera
- Family: Carposinidae
- Genus: Carposina
- Species: C. chersodes

Binomial name
- Carposina chersodes Meyrick, 1915

Species of moth

Carposina chersodes is a moth in the family Carposinidae. It was described by Edward Meyrick in 1915. It is found in Eritrea.

This species has a wingspan of 14 mm. Its larvae feed on Olea chrysophylla.
