= Carposina coreana =

Scientific classification
- Kingdom: Animalia
- Phylum: Arthropoda
- Clade: Pancrustacea
- Class: Insecta
- Order: Lepidoptera
- Family: Carposinidae
- Genus: Carposina
- Species: C. coreana

Binomial name
- Carposina coreana Kim, 1955

Synonyms
- Asiacarposina cornusvora Yang, 1982

Species of moth

Carposina coreana is a moth in the family Carposinidae. It was described by Chang Whan Kim in 1955. It is found in Korea and China.
