= Carposina atlanticella =

Scientific classification
- Kingdom: Animalia
- Phylum: Arthropoda
- Clade: Pancrustacea
- Class: Insecta
- Order: Lepidoptera
- Family: Carposinidae
- Genus: Carposina
- Species: C. atlanticella

Binomial name
- Carposina atlanticella Rebel, 1894

Species of moth

Carposina atlanticella is a moth in the Carposinidae family. It is found on Madeira.

This species has a wingspan of approximately 15 mm. The forewings are primarily whitish-gray with rust-brown markings, while the hindwings are also whitish-gray.
