= Carposina brachycentra =

Scientific classification
- Kingdom: Animalia
- Phylum: Arthropoda
- Clade: Pancrustacea
- Class: Insecta
- Order: Lepidoptera
- Family: Carposinidae
- Genus: Carposina
- Species: C. brachycentra

Binomial name
- Carposina brachycentra Meyrick, 1914

Species of moth

Carposina brachycentra is a moth in the family Carposinidae. It was described by Edward Meyrick in 1914. It is found in South Africa.
