= Carposina hercotis =

Scientific classification
- Kingdom: Animalia
- Phylum: Arthropoda
- Clade: Pancrustacea
- Class: Insecta
- Order: Lepidoptera
- Family: Carposinidae
- Genus: Carposina
- Species: C. hercotis

Binomial name
- Carposina hercotis Meyrick, 1913

Species of moth

Carposina hercotis is a moth in the family Carposinidae. It was described by Edward Meyrick in 1913. It is found in Assam, India.
