= Carposina asbolopis =

Scientific classification
- Kingdom: Animalia
- Phylum: Arthropoda
- Clade: Pancrustacea
- Class: Insecta
- Order: Lepidoptera
- Family: Carposinidae
- Genus: Carposina
- Species: C. asbolopis

Binomial name
- Carposina asbolopis Meyrick, 1928

Species of moth

Carposina asbolopis is a moth in the family Carposinidae. It was described by Edward Meyrick in 1928. It is found in New Caledonia.
