= Carposina euphanes =

Scientific classification
- Kingdom: Animalia
- Phylum: Arthropoda
- Clade: Pancrustacea
- Class: Insecta
- Order: Lepidoptera
- Family: Carposinidae
- Genus: Carposina
- Species: C. euphanes

Binomial name
- Carposina euphanes Bradley, 1956

Species of moth

Carposina euphanes is a moth in the Carposinidae family. It was described by John David Bradley in 1956. It is found on Lord Howe Island in the Tasman Sea.
