= Carposina crypsichola =

Scientific classification
- Kingdom: Animalia
- Phylum: Arthropoda
- Clade: Pancrustacea
- Class: Insecta
- Order: Lepidoptera
- Family: Carposinidae
- Genus: Carposina
- Species: C. crypsichola

Binomial name
- Carposina crypsichola Meyrick, 1910

Species of moth

Carposina crypsichola is a moth in the Carposinidae family. It is found on Sumatra.
