= Carposina cervinella =

Scientific classification
- Kingdom: Animalia
- Phylum: Arthropoda
- Clade: Pancrustacea
- Class: Insecta
- Order: Lepidoptera
- Family: Carposinidae
- Genus: Carposina
- Species: C. cervinella

Binomial name
- Carposina cervinella (Walsingham, 1907)

Synonyms
- Heterocrossa cervinella Walsingham, 1907

Species of moth

Carposina cervinella is a moth of the family Carposinidae.It was first described by Lord Walsingham in 1907. It is endemic to the Hawaiian island of Kauai.
