= Carposina mesospila =

Scientific classification
- Kingdom: Animalia
- Phylum: Arthropoda
- Clade: Pancrustacea
- Class: Insecta
- Order: Lepidoptera
- Family: Carposinidae
- Genus: Carposina
- Species: C. mesospila

Binomial name
- Carposina mesospila Meyrick, 1920

Species of moth

Carposina mesospila is a moth in the family Carposinidae. It was described by Edward Meyrick in 1920. It is found in Kenya.
