= Carposina ekbatana =

Scientific classification
- Kingdom: Animalia
- Phylum: Arthropoda
- Clade: Pancrustacea
- Class: Insecta
- Order: Lepidoptera
- Family: Carposinidae
- Genus: Carposina
- Species: C. ekbatana

Binomial name
- Carposina ekbatana Amsel, 1978

Synonyms
- Carposina ecbatana

Species of insect

Carposina ekbatana is a moth in the Carposinidae family. It was described by Hans Georg Amsel in 1978. It is found in Iran.
