= Carposina maritima =

Scientific classification
- Kingdom: Animalia
- Phylum: Arthropoda
- Clade: Pancrustacea
- Class: Insecta
- Order: Lepidoptera
- Family: Carposinidae
- Genus: Carposina
- Species: C. maritima

Binomial name
- Carposina maritima Ponomarenko, 1999

Species of moth

Carposina maritima is a moth in the Carposinidae family. It was described by Ponomarenko in 1999. It is found in the Russian Far East.

The wingspan is 13-15.5 mm.
