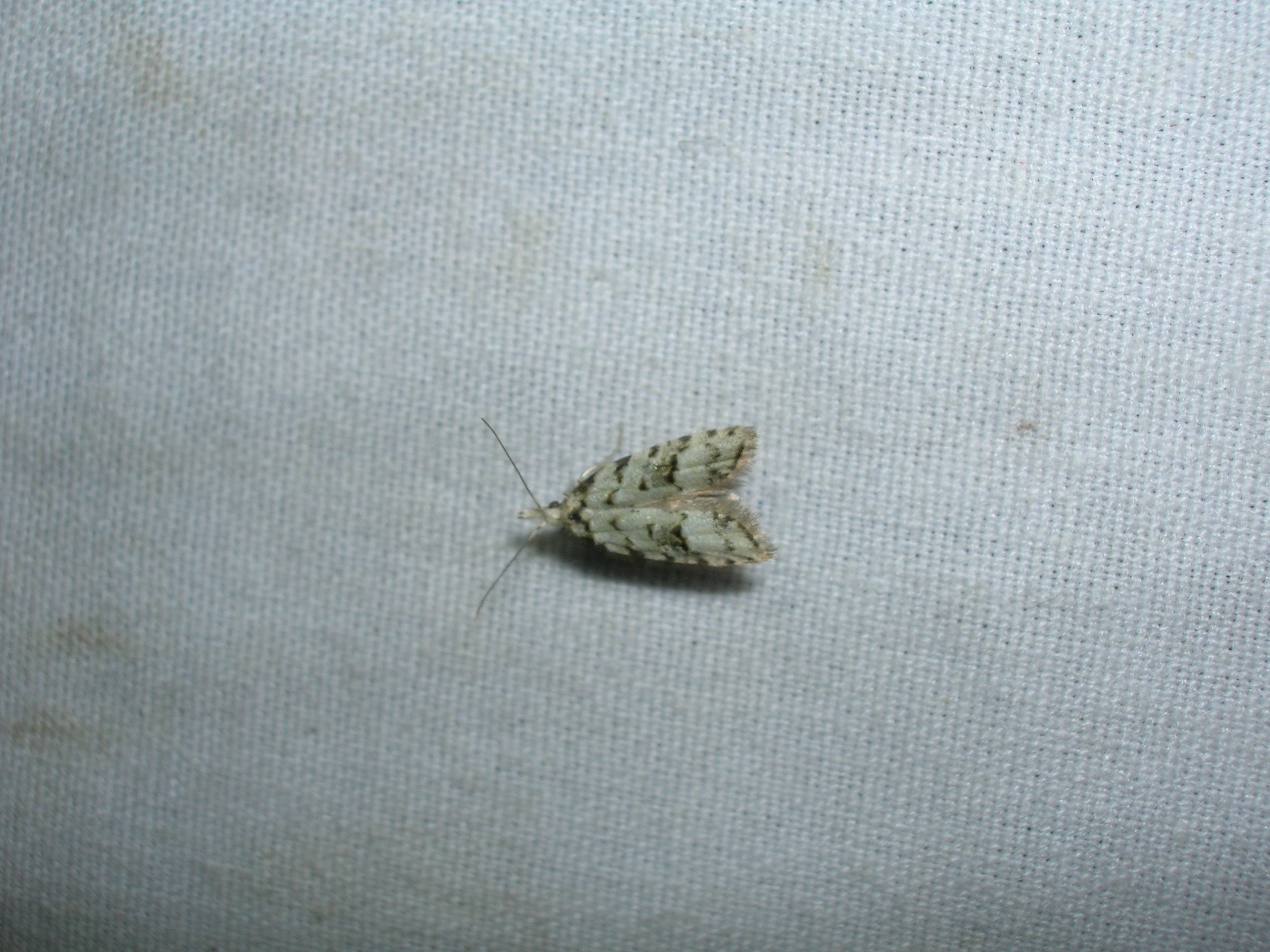

Scientific classification
- Kingdom: Animalia
- Phylum: Arthropoda
- Clade: Pancrustacea
- Class: Insecta
- Order: Lepidoptera
- Family: Carposinidae
- Genus: Carposina
- Species: C. gracillima

Binomial name
- Carposina gracillima (Walsingham, 1907)

Synonyms
- Heterocrossa gracillima Walsingham, 1907

= Carposina gracillima =

Species of moth

Carposina gracillima is a moth of the family Carposinidae. It was first described by Lord Walsingham in 1907. It is endemic to the Hawaiian islands of Kauai, Oahu, Molokai, Maui and Hawaii.

The larvae feed in the berries of Styphelia species.
