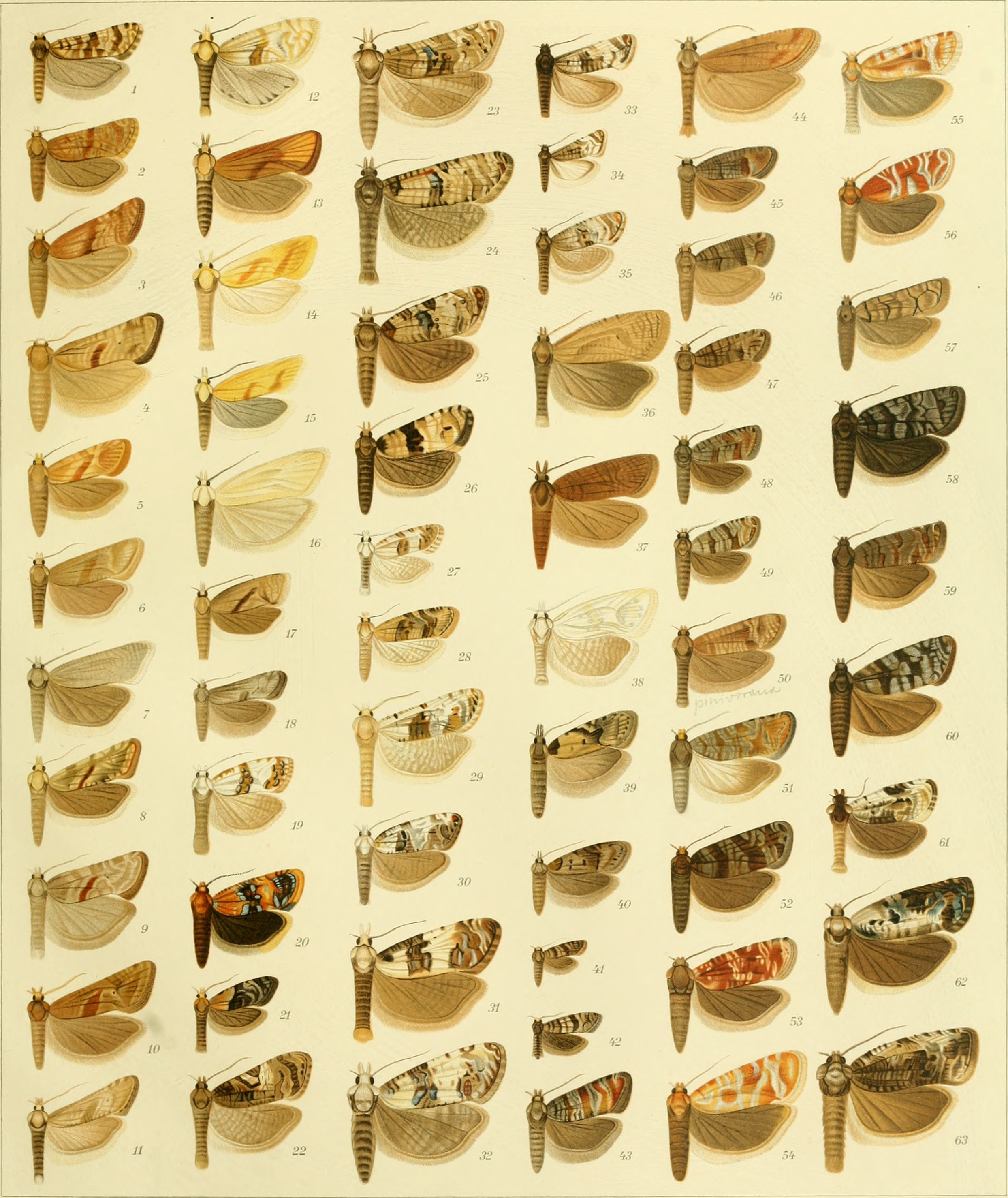
- Carposina berberidella in Kennel Die palaearktischen tortriciden figure 40 female

Scientific classification
- Kingdom: Animalia
- Phylum: Arthropoda
- Clade: Pancrustacea
- Class: Insecta
- Order: Lepidoptera
- Family: Carposinidae
- Genus: Carposina
- Species: C. berberidella

Binomial name
- Carposina berberidella Herrich-Schäffer, 1853

= Carposina berberidella =

Species of moth

Carposina berberidella is a moth of the Carposinidae family. It is found from Spain, Italy, Germany, Austria, Poland, the Czech Republic, Slovakia, former Yugoslavia and the European part of Russia to the Middle East.

The wingspan is about 14.5 mm.

The larvae feed on Berberis species. They feed inside the fruit of their host plant.
