= Carposina lembula =

Scientific classification
- Kingdom: Animalia
- Phylum: Arthropoda
- Clade: Pancrustacea
- Class: Insecta
- Order: Lepidoptera
- Family: Carposinidae
- Genus: Carposina
- Species: C. lembula

Binomial name
- Carposina lembula (Meyrick, 1910)

Synonyms
- Meridarchis lembula Meyrick, 1910; Meridarchis hylactica Meyrick, 1938

Species of moth

Carposina lembula is a moth in the Carposinidae family. It was described by Edward Meyrick in 1910. It is found on Java.

The wingspan is 20 mm (0.79 in).
