= Carposina impavida =

Scientific classification
- Kingdom: Animalia
- Phylum: Arthropoda
- Clade: Pancrustacea
- Class: Insecta
- Order: Lepidoptera
- Family: Carposinidae
- Genus: Carposina
- Species: C. impavida

Binomial name
- Carposina impavida Meyrick, 1913

Species of moth

Carposina impavida is a moth in the family Carposinidae. It was described by Edward Meyrick in 1913. It is found on the Comoros and in the Democratic Republic of the Congo.

The larvae feed on Mallotus oppositifolius and Maesobotrya species.
