= Carposina graminicolor =

Scientific classification
- Kingdom: Animalia
- Phylum: Arthropoda
- Clade: Pancrustacea
- Class: Insecta
- Order: Lepidoptera
- Family: Carposinidae
- Genus: Carposina
- Species: C. graminicolor

Binomial name
- Carposina graminicolor (Walsingham, 1907)

Synonyms
- Heterocrossa graminicolor Walsingham, 1907

Species of moth

Carposina graminicolor is a moth of the family Carposinidae. It was first described by Lord Walsingham in 1907. It is endemic to the Hawaiian islands of Kauai, Oahu and Hawaii.

The larvae feed on Osmanthus sandwicensis and Plectronia odorata.
