= Carposina gemmata =

Scientific classification
- Kingdom: Animalia
- Phylum: Arthropoda
- Clade: Pancrustacea
- Class: Insecta
- Order: Lepidoptera
- Family: Carposinidae
- Genus: Carposina
- Species: C. gemmata

Binomial name
- Carposina gemmata (Walsingham, 1907)

Synonyms
- Heterocrossa gemmata Walsingham, 1907

Species of moth

Carposina gemmata is a moth of the family Carposinidae. It was first described by Lord Walsingham in 1907. It is endemic to the Hawaiian islands of Oahu and Hawaii.

Larvae have been recorded on the buds and fruits of Clermontia and Cyanea species.
