= Carposina saurates =

Scientific classification
- Kingdom: Animalia
- Phylum: Arthropoda
- Clade: Pancrustacea
- Class: Insecta
- Order: Lepidoptera
- Family: Carposinidae
- Genus: Carposina
- Species: C. saurates

Binomial name
- Carposina saurates Meyrick, 1913

Synonyms
- Carposina nereitis Meyrick, 1913

Species of moth

Carposina saurates is a moth of the family Carposinidae. It was first described by Edward Meyrick in 1913. It is endemic to the Hawaiian island of Oahu.
