= Carposina engalactis =

Scientific classification
- Kingdom: Animalia
- Phylum: Arthropoda
- Clade: Pancrustacea
- Class: Insecta
- Order: Lepidoptera
- Family: Carposinidae
- Genus: Carposina
- Species: C. engalactis

Binomial name
- Carposina engalactis Meyrick, 1932

Species of moth

Carposina engalactis is a moth in the family Carposinidae. It was described by Edward Meyrick in 1932. It is found in Brazil.

== Appearance ==
Described as being uniformly whitish, with antennae the same colour as the head.
