= Carposina scierotoxa =

Scientific classification
- Kingdom: Animalia
- Phylum: Arthropoda
- Clade: Pancrustacea
- Class: Insecta
- Order: Lepidoptera
- Family: Carposinidae
- Genus: Carposina
- Species: C. scierotoxa

Binomial name
- Carposina scierotoxa Meyrick, 1924

Species of moth

Carposina scierotoxa is a moth in the Carposinidae family. It is found in Uganda.
