= Carposina askoldana =

Scientific classification
- Kingdom: Animalia
- Phylum: Arthropoda
- Clade: Pancrustacea
- Class: Insecta
- Order: Lepidoptera
- Family: Carposinidae
- Genus: Carposina
- Species: C. askoldana

Binomial name
- Carposina askoldana Diakonoff, 1989

Species of moth

Carposina askoldana is a moth in the Carposinidae family. It was described by Alexey Diakonoff in 1989. It is found on Askold Island in the Russian Far East.
