= Carposina rosella =

Scientific classification
- Kingdom: Animalia
- Phylum: Arthropoda
- Clade: Pancrustacea
- Class: Insecta
- Order: Lepidoptera
- Family: Carposinidae
- Genus: Carposina
- Species: C. rosella

Binomial name
- Carposina rosella Kuznetsov, 1975

Species of moth

Carposina rosella is a moth in the family Carposinidae. It was described by Vladimir Ivanovitsch Kuznetsov in 1975. It is found in Tajikistan.
