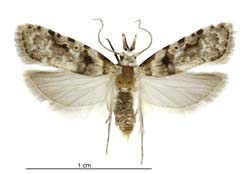

Scientific classification
- Kingdom: Animalia
- Phylum: Arthropoda
- Class: Insecta
- Order: Lepidoptera
- Family: Carposinidae
- Genus: Coscinoptycha
- Species: C. improbana

Binomial name
- Coscinoptycha improbana Meyrick, 1881

= Coscinoptycha improbana =

Species of moth

Coscinoptycha improbana, the Australian guava moth, is a moth of the family Carposinidae and only member of the genus Coscinoptycha. This species is native to Australia but is invasive to New Zealand since 1999 and New Caledonia since 2012. The larvae of this species have been recorded as feeding on a wide variety of fruits and nuts including agricultural crops such as citrus, plums, pears, peaches, feijoa and guava. As such this species is regarded as an agricultural pest. However using a pheromone dispenser armed with the synthesised sex pheromone of the asian peach moth can confuse C. improbana males and disrupt the breeding of this pest species.

== Taxonomy ==
This species was first described by Edward Meyrick in 1881. The syntype of this species is held at the Natural History Museum, London.

== Description ==
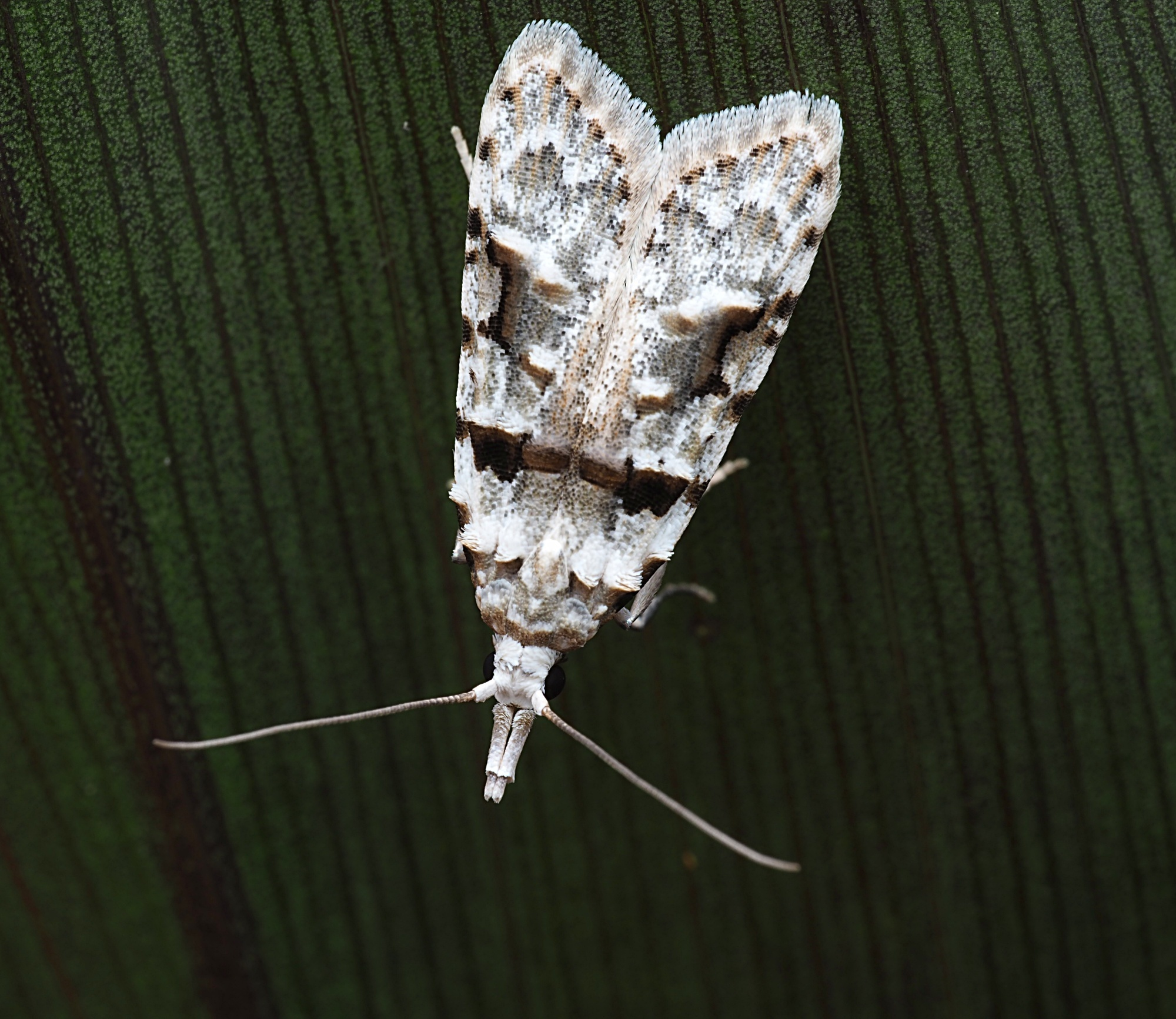
Living specimen of C. improbana.

Meyrick described this species as follows:

♂ ♀ . 6 3/4"-7 1/2". Head silvery-white. Palpi white, basal two-thirds of second joint sharply dark fuscous beneath. Antennae in male fuscous, basal joint white; in female whitish. Thorax white, somewhat mixed with fuscous. Abdomen whitish. Legs whitish, anterior and middle tibiae and tarsi broadly banded with dark fuscous. Fore wings very narrow, costa somewhat bent close to base and a little before apex, almost sinuate in middle, hindmargin nearly straight, very oblique; white, in male with an irregular ochreous-grey suffusion towards margins; about seven irregularly placed black linear spots on costa; in male a raised longitudinal bladder-like membranous ridge, extending in disc from near base to two-fifths, its costal half clothed with white scales, dorsal half naked, pellucid, and shining; in female this is absent, but there is a small irregular blackish spot in disc at two-fifths; a grey cloudy spot on inner margin at two-fifths, extending half across wing, in male containing a transverse blackish mark, in female obscurely mixed with blackish; a rather broad grey transverse central suffusion, containing in male a short longitudinal black linear [mark near middle, in female a small roundish black spot and some scattered black scales; a row of indistinct linear blackish spots along hindmargin : cilia whitish, suffused with grey, obscurely barred with darker. Hindwings thinly scaled, whitish, apex greyish-tinged; cilia whitish, faintly greyish-tinged round apex.

== Distribution ==
It is native to Australia, where it is found from Eungella in Queensland down through New South Wales, Victoria and Tasmania. It also occurs on Norfolk Island, in New Caledonia since 2012 and New Zealand since 1999. In New Zealand it has been observed in the Northland, Auckland and Waikato regions.

== Behaviour ==
Adults are on wing year-round.

== Hosts ==
The larvae have been recorded feeding on a wide variety of nuts and fruits including Psidium species (including Psidium guajava), Feijoa sellowiana, Macadamia integrifolia, Eriobotyra japonica, Prunus domestica, Prunus persicae, Pyrus pyrifolia, Citrus species (including Citrus unshiu and Citrus limon), Cassine australis and Schizomeria ovata with the larvae eating into the flesh of fruits and nuts.

== Interactions with humans ==
As the larvae of this moth causes damage to corps it is therefore regarded as being an agricultural pest. In New Zealand this species is considered a serious problem for those farmers in Northland growing macadamias and feijoas.

It has been shown that by using a pheromone dispenser armed with the synthesised sex pheromone of the asian peach moth (Carposina sasakii), this can confuse C. improbana males and disrupt the breeding of this species.
