= Carposina roesleri =

Scientific classification
- Kingdom: Animalia
- Phylum: Arthropoda
- Clade: Pancrustacea
- Class: Insecta
- Order: Lepidoptera
- Family: Carposinidae
- Genus: Carposina
- Species: C. roesleri

Binomial name
- Carposina roesleri Amsel, 1977

Species of moth

Carposina roesleri is a moth in the Carposinidae family. It was described by Hans Georg Amsel in 1977. It is found in Iran.
