= Carposina bullata =

Scientific classification
- Kingdom: Animalia
- Phylum: Arthropoda
- Clade: Pancrustacea
- Class: Insecta
- Order: Lepidoptera
- Family: Carposinidae
- Genus: Carposina
- Species: C. bullata

Binomial name
- Carposina bullata Meyrick, 1913

Species of moth

Carposina bullata is a moth of the Carposinidae family. It is native to Trinidad and Tobago, but has been introduced to Hawaii as biological control agent of the weed Clidemia hirta.

The larvae feed on the fruit and flowers of Clidemia hirta.
