= Carposina olivaceonitens =

Scientific classification
- Kingdom: Animalia
- Phylum: Arthropoda
- Clade: Pancrustacea
- Class: Insecta
- Order: Lepidoptera
- Family: Carposinidae
- Genus: Carposina
- Species: C. olivaceonitens

Binomial name
- Carposina olivaceonitens (Walsingham, 1907)

Synonyms
- Heterocrossa olivaceonitens Walsingham, 1907

Species of moth

Carposina olivaceonitens is a moth of the family Carposinidae. It was first described by Lord Walsingham in 1907. It is endemic to the Hawaiian islands of Kauai, Oahu, Maui and Hawaii.

The larvae feed on flowers, flower buds and fruit of Clermontia and Planchonella species.
