= Carposina mesophaea =

Scientific classification
- Kingdom: Animalia
- Phylum: Arthropoda
- Clade: Pancrustacea
- Class: Insecta
- Order: Lepidoptera
- Family: Carposinidae
- Genus: Carposina
- Species: C. mesophaea

Binomial name
- Carposina mesophaea Bradley, 1965

Species of moth

Carposina mesophaea is a moth in the Carposinidae family. It was described by John David Bradley in 1965 and is found in Uganda.
