= Carposina solutella =

Scientific classification
- Kingdom: Animalia
- Phylum: Arthropoda
- Clade: Pancrustacea
- Class: Insecta
- Order: Lepidoptera
- Family: Carposinidae
- Genus: Carposina
- Species: C. solutella

Binomial name
- Carposina solutella (Walsingham, 1907)

Synonyms
- Heterocrossa solutella Walsingham, 1907

Species of moth

Carposina solutella is a moth of the family Carposinidae. It was first described by Lord Walsingham in 1907. It is endemic to the Hawaiian islands of Oahu and Hawaii.

The larvae feed on Hedyotis species.
