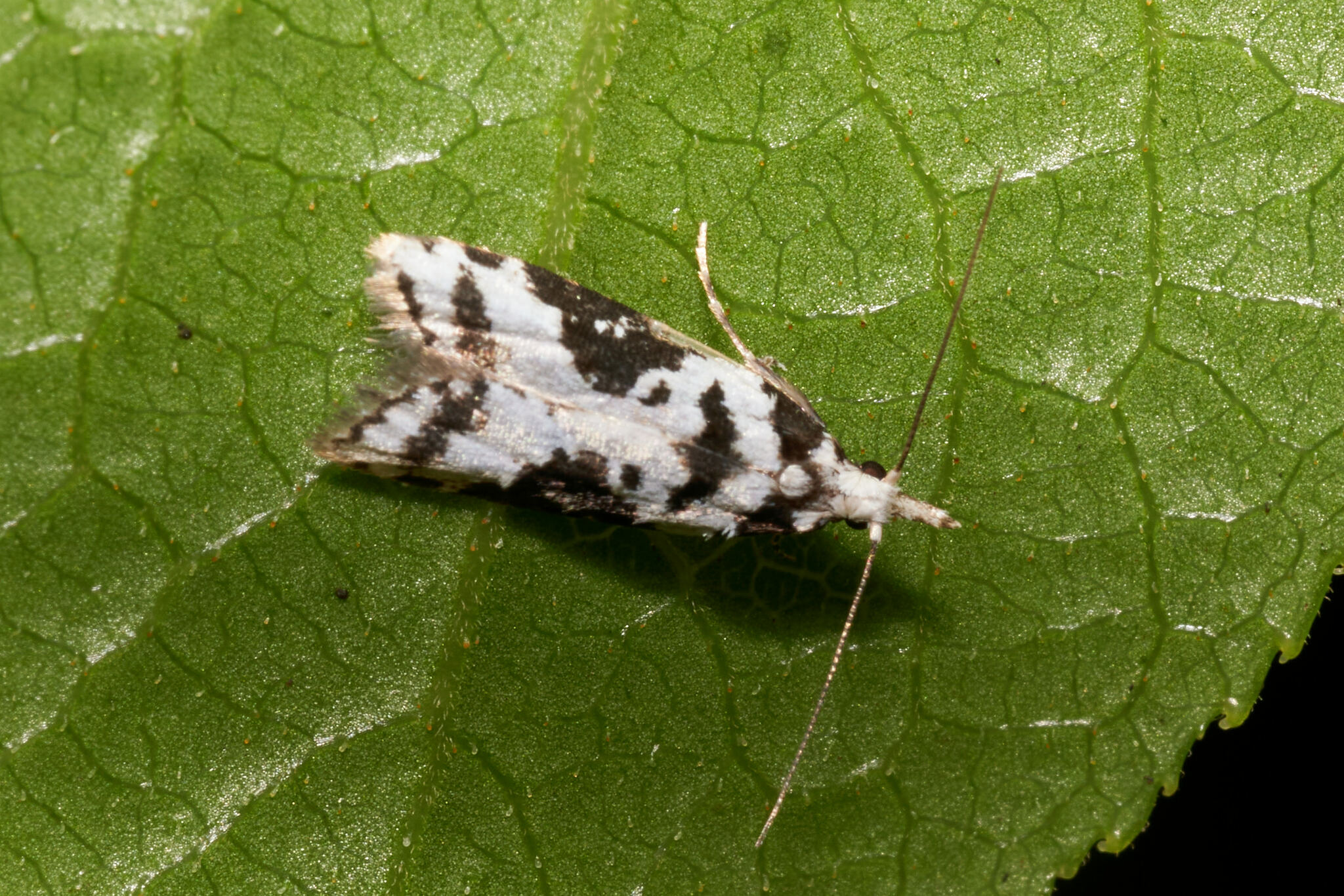

Scientific classification
- Kingdom: Animalia
- Phylum: Arthropoda
- Clade: Pancrustacea
- Class: Insecta
- Order: Lepidoptera
- Family: Carposinidae
- Genus: Carposina
- Species: C. inscripta

Binomial name
- Carposina inscripta (Walsingham, 1907)

Synonyms
- Heterocrossa inscripta Walsingham, 1907

= Carposina inscripta =

Species of moth

Carposina inscripta is a moth of the family Carposinidae. It was first described by Lord Walsingham in 1907. It is endemic to the island of Hawaii.

The larvae feed in the berries of Vaccinium reticulatum.
