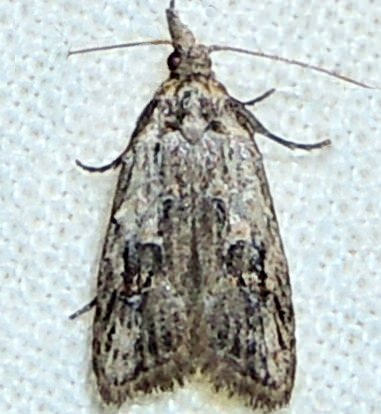

Scientific classification
- Kingdom: Animalia
- Phylum: Arthropoda
- Clade: Pancrustacea
- Class: Insecta
- Order: Lepidoptera
- Family: Carposinidae
- Genus: Carposina
- Species: C. simulator

Binomial name
- Carposina simulator Davis, 1969

= Carposina simulator =

Species of moth

Carposina simulator is a moth in the Carposinidae family. It was described by Donald R. Davis in 1969. It is found in North America, where it has been recorded from Arkansas.
