= Carposina diampyx =

Scientific classification
- Kingdom: Animalia
- Phylum: Arthropoda
- Clade: Pancrustacea
- Class: Insecta
- Order: Lepidoptera
- Family: Carposinidae
- Genus: Carposina
- Species: C. diampyx

Binomial name
- Carposina diampyx Diakonoff, 1989

Species of moth

Carposina diampyx is a moth in the Carposinidae family. It is found in Armenia.
