= Carposina tetratoma =

Scientific classification
- Kingdom: Animalia
- Phylum: Arthropoda
- Clade: Pancrustacea
- Class: Insecta
- Order: Lepidoptera
- Family: Carposinidae
- Genus: Carposina
- Species: C. tetratoma

Binomial name
- Carposina tetratoma Diakonoff, 1989

Species of moth

Carposina tetratoma is a moth in the Carposinidae family. It was described by Alexey Diakonoff in 1989. It is found in Afghanistan.
