= Carposina subselliata =

Scientific classification
- Kingdom: Animalia
- Phylum: Arthropoda
- Clade: Pancrustacea
- Class: Insecta
- Order: Lepidoptera
- Family: Carposinidae
- Genus: Carposina
- Species: C. subselliata

Binomial name
- Carposina subselliata Meyrick, 1921

Species of moth

Carposina subselliata is a moth in the family Carposinidae. It was described by Edward Meyrick in 1921. It is found in South Africa.
