= Carposina viridis =

Scientific classification
- Kingdom: Animalia
- Phylum: Arthropoda
- Clade: Pancrustacea
- Class: Insecta
- Order: Lepidoptera
- Family: Carposinidae
- Genus: Carposina
- Species: C. viridis

Binomial name
- Carposina viridis (Walsingham, 1907)

Synonyms
- Heterocrossa viridis Walsingham, 1907

Species of moth

Carposina viridis, the green carposinid moth, is a moth of the family Carposinidae. It was first described by Lord Walsingham in 1907. It is endemic to the Hawaiian islands of Kauai and Oahu.

The larvae feed on Cyrtandra cordifolia. The larvae bore in the stem of their host plant.
