= Carposina longipalpalis =

Scientific classification
- Kingdom: Animalia
- Phylum: Arthropoda
- Clade: Pancrustacea
- Class: Insecta
- Order: Lepidoptera
- Family: Carposinidae
- Genus: Carposina
- Species: C. longipalpalis

Binomial name
- Carposina longipalpalis Mey, 2007

Species of moth

Carposina longipalpalis is a moth in the family Carposinidae. It was described by Wolfram Mey in 2007. It is found in Namibia.
