= Carposina altivaga =

Scientific classification
- Kingdom: Animalia
- Phylum: Arthropoda
- Clade: Pancrustacea
- Class: Insecta
- Order: Lepidoptera
- Family: Carposinidae
- Genus: Carposina
- Species: C. altivaga

Binomial name
- Carposina altivaga Meyrick, 1925

Species of moth

Carposina altivaga is a moth in the family Carposinidae. It was described by Edward Meyrick in 1925. It is found in the Democratic Republic of the Congo.
