= Carposina subumbrata =

Scientific classification
- Kingdom: Animalia
- Phylum: Arthropoda
- Clade: Pancrustacea
- Class: Insecta
- Order: Lepidoptera
- Family: Carposinidae
- Genus: Carposina
- Species: C. subumbrata

Binomial name
- Carposina subumbrata (Walsingham, 1907)

Synonyms
- Heterocrossa subumbrata Walsingham, 1907

Species of moth

Carposina subumbrata is a moth of the family Carposinidae. It was first described by Lord Walsingham in 1907. It is endemic to the Hawaiian island of Oahu.

The larvae feed on Scaevola chamissoniana. They form galls on the stems of their host plant.
