= Carposina megalosema =

Scientific classification
- Kingdom: Animalia
- Phylum: Arthropoda
- Clade: Pancrustacea
- Class: Insecta
- Order: Lepidoptera
- Family: Carposinidae
- Genus: Carposina
- Species: C. megalosema

Binomial name
- Carposina megalosema Diakonoff, 1949

Species of moth

Carposina megalosema is a moth in the Carposinidae family. It was described by Alexey Diakonoff in 1949. It is found on Java.
