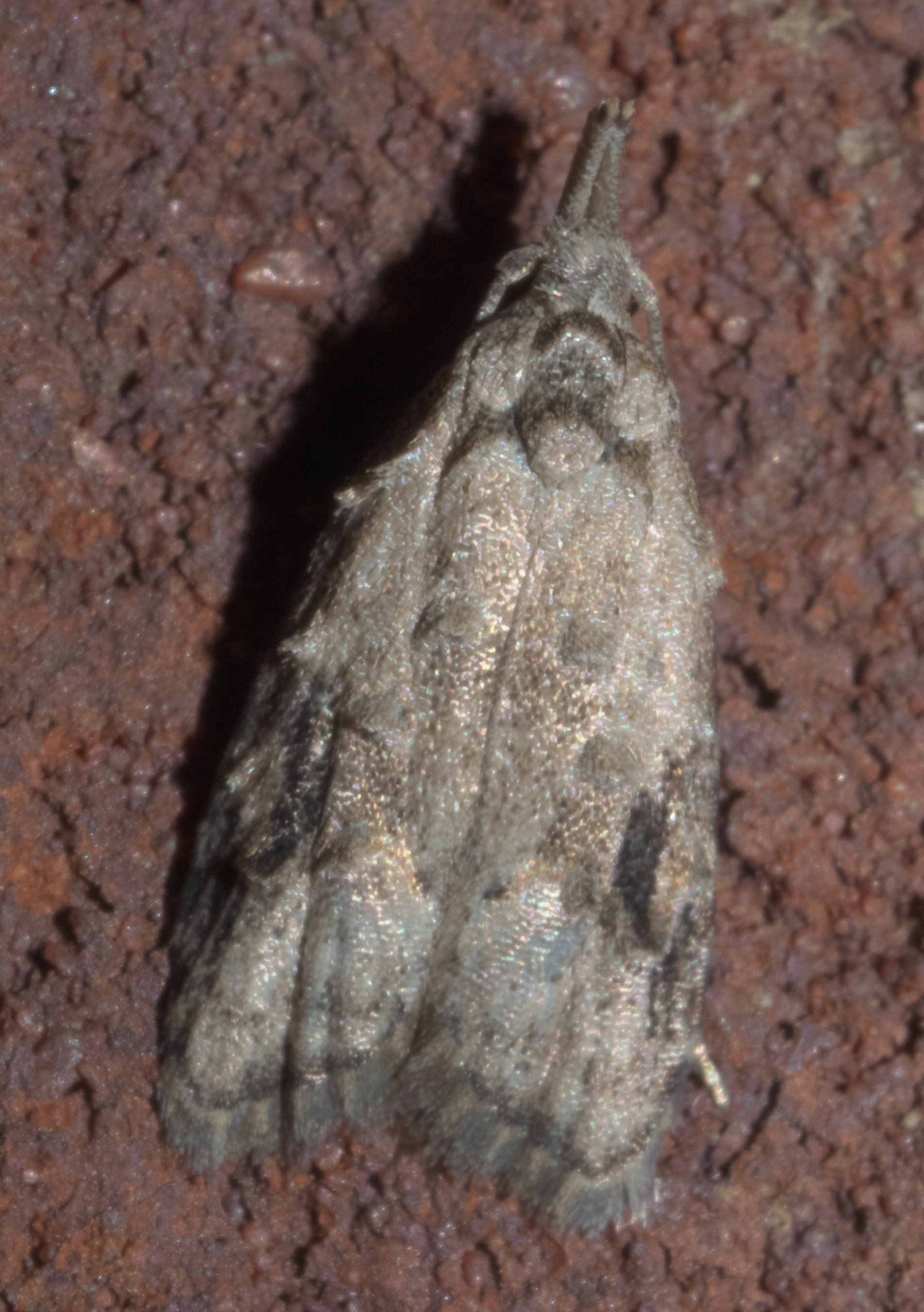

Scientific classification
- Kingdom: Animalia
- Phylum: Arthropoda
- Clade: Pancrustacea
- Class: Insecta
- Order: Lepidoptera
- Family: Carposinidae
- Genus: Carposina
- Species: C. fernaldana

Binomial name
- Carposina fernaldana Busck, 1907

= Carposina fernaldana =

Species of moth

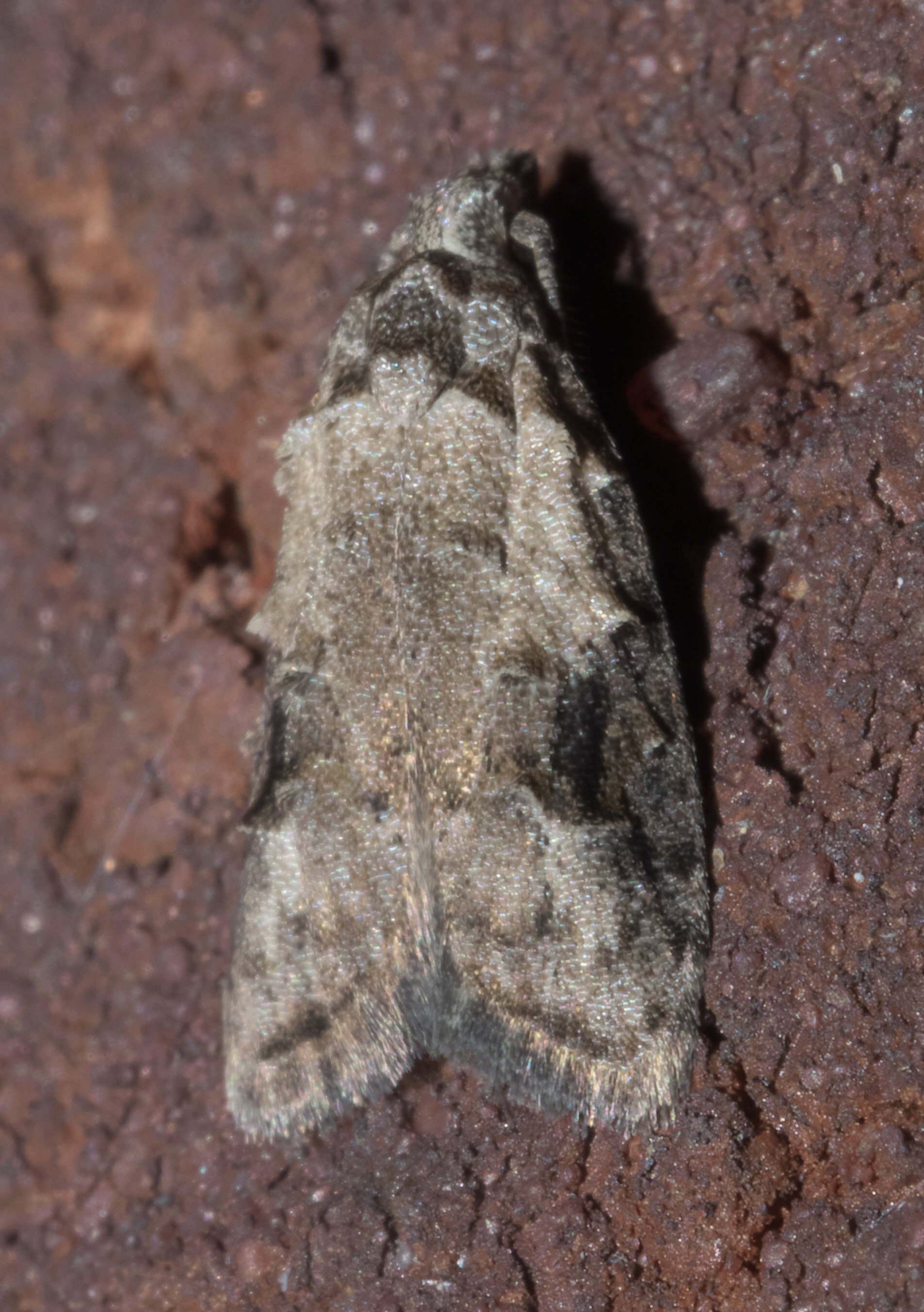
Carposina fernaldana, currant fruitworm moth, Size: 7.3 mm

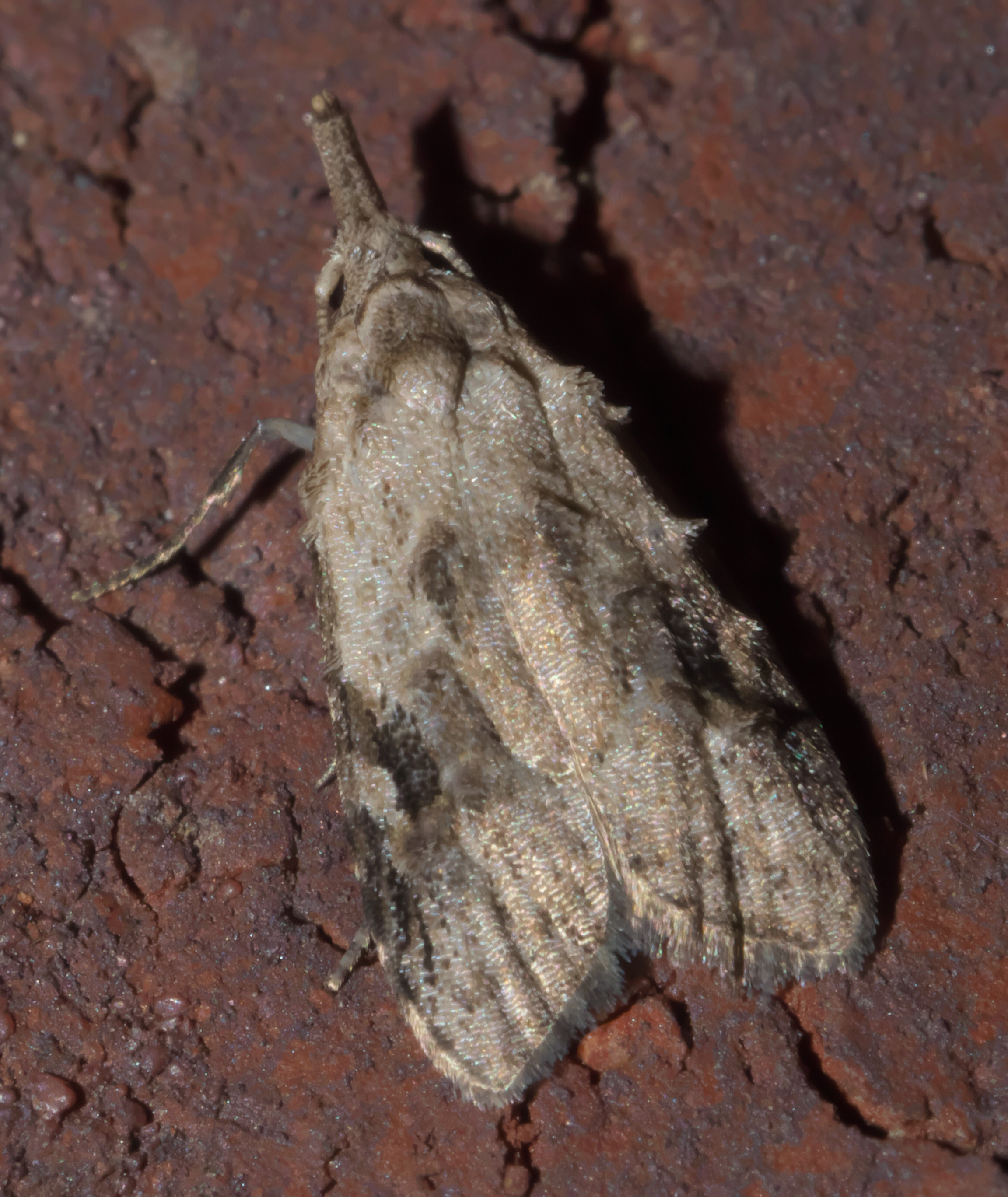
Carposina fernaldana, currant fruitworm moth, Size: 8.5 mm

Carposina fernaldana, the currant fruitworm moth, is a moth in the Carposinidae family. It was described by August Busck in 1907. It is found in North America, where it is found from Quebec, along the Mississippi drainage, to Missouri.

The wingspan is 15–20 mm.

The larvae feed on Crataegus and Ribes species.

== Etymology ==
The species is named in honour of Charles H. Fernald.
