= Carposina autologa =

Scientific classification
- Kingdom: Animalia
- Phylum: Arthropoda
- Clade: Pancrustacea
- Class: Insecta
- Order: Lepidoptera
- Family: Carposinidae
- Genus: Carposina
- Species: C. autologa

Binomial name
- Carposina autologa Meyrick, 1910

Synonyms
- Carposina sysciodes Turner, 1947

Species of moth

Carposina autologa, the hakea seed-moth, is a moth in the Carposinidae family. It is found in Australia, where it has been recorded from Western Australia. It has been released in South Africa for the biological control Hakea sericea.

The wingspan is about 10 mm.

The larvae feed on the seeds of Hakea sericea and Hakea nodosa.
