= Carposina paracrinifera =

Scientific classification
- Kingdom: Animalia
- Phylum: Arthropoda
- Clade: Pancrustacea
- Class: Insecta
- Order: Lepidoptera
- Family: Carposinidae
- Genus: Carposina
- Species: C. paracrinifera

Binomial name
- Carposina paracrinifera Clarke, 1971

Species of moth

Carposina paracrinifera is a moth in the Carposinidae family. It was described by Clarke in 1971. It is found on Rapa Island.
