= Carposina carcinopa =

Scientific classification
- Kingdom: Animalia
- Phylum: Arthropoda
- Clade: Pancrustacea
- Class: Insecta
- Order: Lepidoptera
- Family: Carposinidae
- Genus: Carposina
- Species: C. carcinopa

Binomial name
- Carposina carcinopa Meyrick, 1927

Species of moth

Carposina carcinopa is a moth in the family Carposinidae. It was described by Edward Meyrick in 1927. It is found on Samoa.
