= Carposina siturga =

Scientific classification
- Kingdom: Animalia
- Phylum: Arthropoda
- Clade: Pancrustacea
- Class: Insecta
- Order: Lepidoptera
- Family: Carposinidae
- Genus: Carposina
- Species: C. siturga

Binomial name
- Carposina siturga Meyrick, 1912

Species of moth

Carposina siturga is a moth in the family Carposinidae. It was described by Edward Meyrick in 1912. It is found in South Africa.
