= Carposina trigononotata =

Scientific classification
- Kingdom: Animalia
- Phylum: Arthropoda
- Clade: Pancrustacea
- Class: Insecta
- Order: Lepidoptera
- Family: Carposinidae
- Genus: Carposina
- Species: C. trigononotata

Binomial name
- Carposina trigononotata (Walsingham, 1907)

Synonyms
- Heterocrossa trigononotata Walsingham, 1907

Species of moth

Carposina trigononotata is a moth of the family Carposinidae. It was first described by Lord Walsingham in 1907. It is endemic to the Hawaiian islands of Molokai and Maui.

The larvae feed on the terminal buds of Metrosideros species. The larvae bore in the stem of their host plant.
