= Carposina pygmaeella =

Scientific classification
- Kingdom: Animalia
- Phylum: Arthropoda
- Clade: Pancrustacea
- Class: Insecta
- Order: Lepidoptera
- Family: Carposinidae
- Genus: Carposina
- Species: C. pygmaeella

Binomial name
- Carposina pygmaeella (Walsingham, 1907)

Synonyms
- Heterocrossa pygmaeella Walsingham, 1907

Species of moth

Carposina pygmaeella is a moth of the family Carposinidae. It was first described by Lord Walsingham in 1907. It is endemic to the island of Hawaii.

The wingspan is about 6 mm, making it the smallest Hawaiian Carposinidae species.
