= Carposina socors =

Scientific classification
- Kingdom: Animalia
- Phylum: Arthropoda
- Clade: Pancrustacea
- Class: Insecta
- Order: Lepidoptera
- Family: Carposinidae
- Genus: Carposina
- Species: C. socors

Binomial name
- Carposina socors Meyrick, 1928

Species of moth

Carposina socors is a moth in the family Carposinidae. It was described by Edward Meyrick in 1928. It is found in South Africa.

The larvae feed on the fruits of Podocarpus species.
