= Carposina achroana =

Scientific classification
- Kingdom: Animalia
- Phylum: Arthropoda
- Clade: Pancrustacea
- Class: Insecta
- Order: Lepidoptera
- Family: Carposinidae
- Genus: Carposina
- Species: C. achroana

Binomial name
- Carposina achroana (Meyrick, 1883)

Synonyms
- Heterocrossa achroana Meyrick, 1883

Species of moth

Carposina achroana is a moth of the family Carposinidae. It was first described by Edward Meyrick in 1883. It is endemic to the island of Hawaii.
