= Carposina thermurga =

Scientific classification
- Kingdom: Animalia
- Phylum: Arthropoda
- Clade: Pancrustacea
- Class: Insecta
- Order: Lepidoptera
- Family: Carposinidae
- Genus: Carposina
- Species: C. thermurga

Binomial name
- Carposina thermurga Meyrick, 1929

Species of moth

Carposina thermurga is a moth in the family Carposinidae. It was described by Edward Meyrick in 1929. It is found in South Africa.
