= Carposina capnarcha =

Scientific classification
- Kingdom: Animalia
- Phylum: Arthropoda
- Clade: Pancrustacea
- Class: Insecta
- Order: Lepidoptera
- Family: Carposinidae
- Genus: Carposina
- Species: C. capnarcha

Binomial name
- Carposina capnarcha (Meyrick, 1938)

Synonyms
- Meridarchis capnarcha Meyrick, 1938

Species of moth

Carposina capnarcha is a moth in the family Carposinidae. It was described by Edward Meyrick in 1938. It is found on New Guinea.
