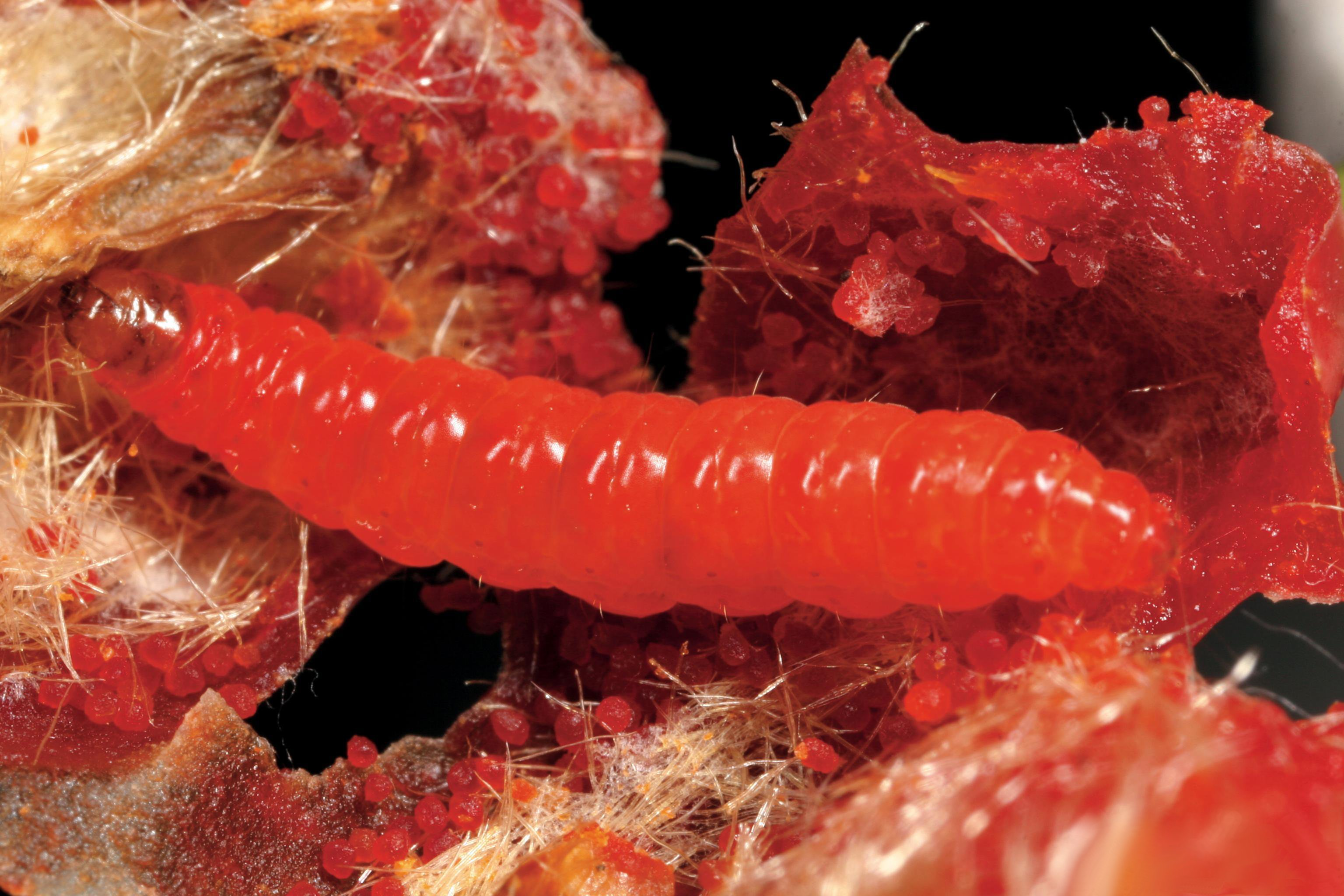
- A larva of Carposina scirrhosella

Scientific classification
- Kingdom: Animalia
- Phylum: Arthropoda
- Clade: Pancrustacea
- Class: Insecta
- Order: Lepidoptera
- Family: Carposinidae
- Genus: Carposina
- Species: C. scirrhosella

Binomial name
- Carposina scirrhosella Herrich-Schäffer, 1854

Synonyms
- Carposina orientella Stanoiu & Nemes, 1968

= Carposina scirrhosella =

Species of moth

Carposina scirrhosella, the peach fruit moth, is a moth of the Carposinidae family. It is found from Germany, Austria, the Czech Republic and Slovakia, Hungary, Serbia, Romania and Bulgaria to the Middle East.

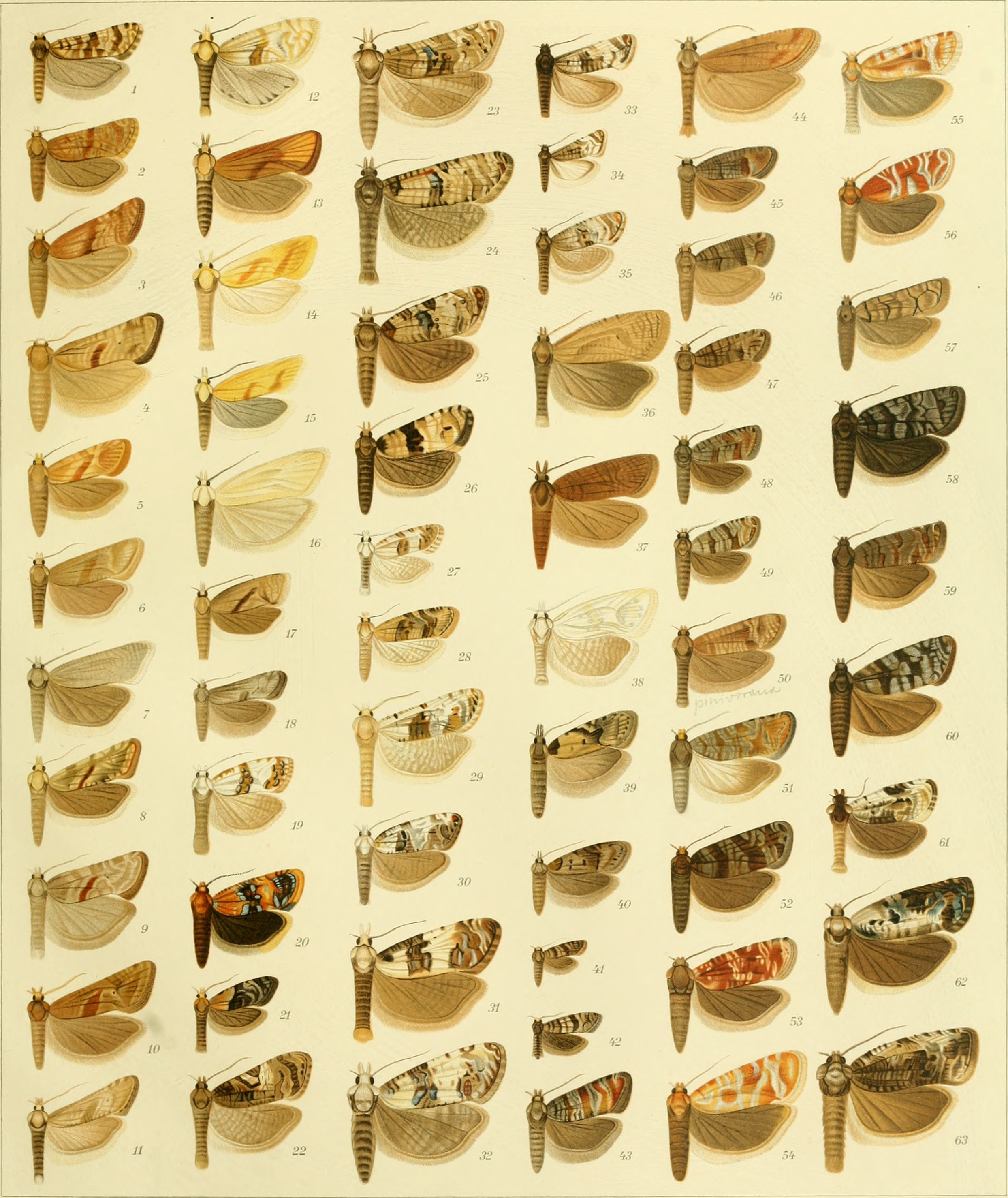
Imago (figure 39 female)

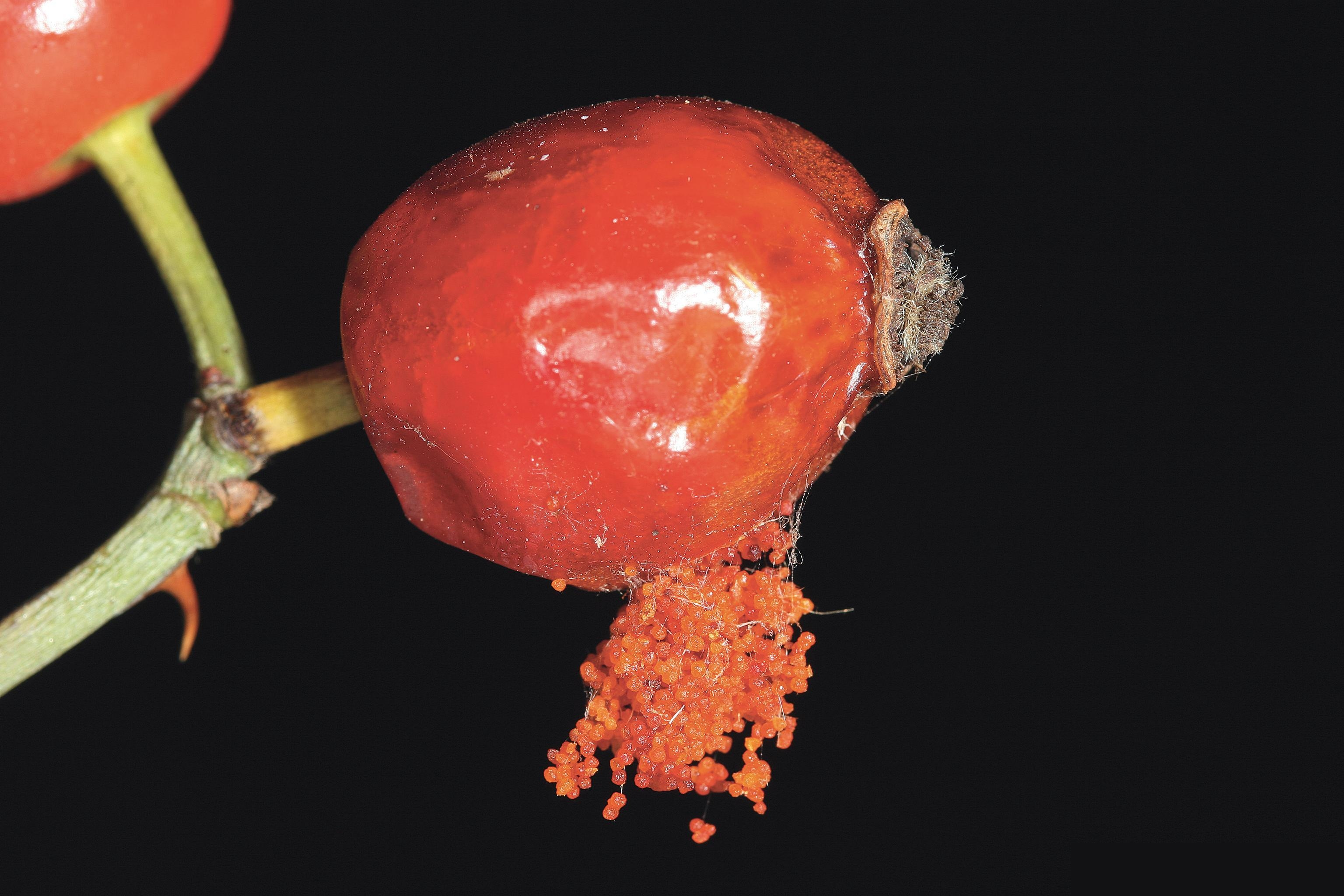
Damage

The wingspan is 11–15 mm. Adults are on wing from June to August.

The larvae feed on Rosa species.
