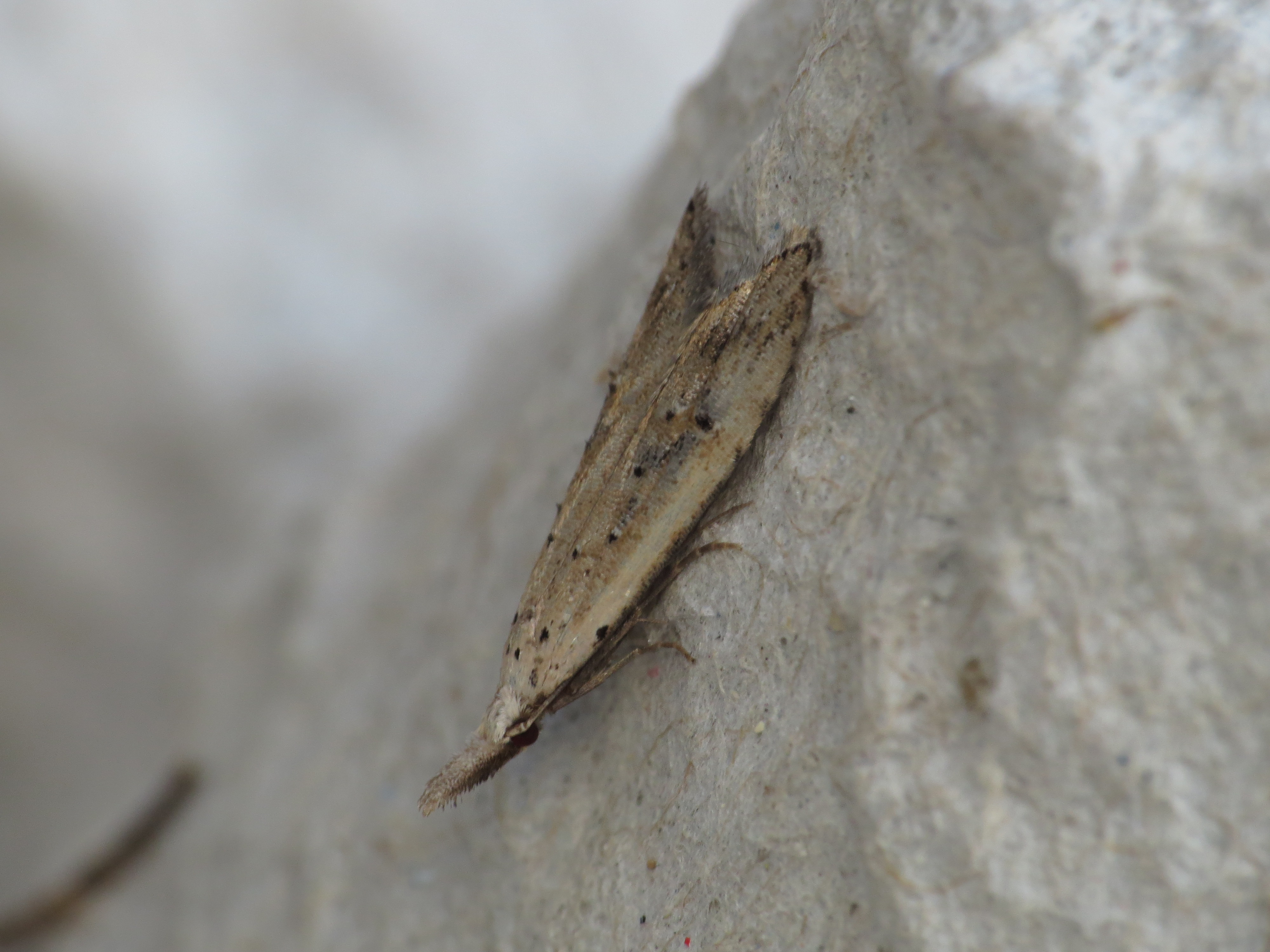

Scientific classification
- Kingdom: Animalia
- Phylum: Arthropoda
- Clade: Pancrustacea
- Class: Insecta
- Order: Lepidoptera
- Family: Carposinidae
- Genus: Carposina
- Species: C. latebrosa

Binomial name
- Carposina latebrosa Meyrick, 1910

= Carposina latebrosa =

Species of moth

Carposina latebrosa is a moth in the family Carposinidae. It was described by Edward Meyrick in 1910. It is found in Australia, where it has been recorded from Tasmania.
