= Coleophora petraea =

Scientific classification
- Kingdom: Animalia
- Phylum: Arthropoda
- Class: Insecta
- Order: Lepidoptera
- Family: Coleophoridae
- Genus: Coleophora
- Species: C. petraea

Binomial name
- Coleophora petraea Falkovich, 1972

Species of moth

Coleophora petraea is a moth of the family Coleophoridae. It is found in Uzbekistan.

The larvae feed on the leaves of Arbuscula arbusculiformis. Larvae can be found from the end of April to May and again from the end of July to August in at least two generations. Fully fed larvae hibernate.
