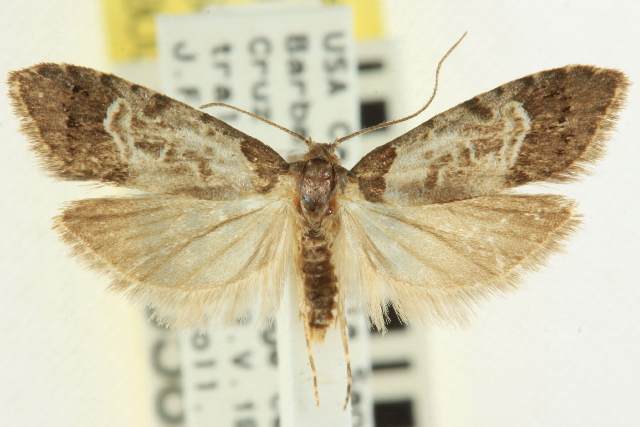

Scientific classification
- Domain: Eukaryota
- Kingdom: Animalia
- Phylum: Arthropoda
- Class: Insecta
- Order: Lepidoptera
- Family: Carposinidae
- Genus: Bondia
- Species: B. comonana

Binomial name
- Bondia comonana (Kearfott, 1907)

Synonyms
- Carposina comonana Kearfott, 1907; Carposina euryleuca Meyrick, 1912

= Bondia comonana =

Species of moth

Bondia comonana, the prune limb borer, is a moth in the Carposinidae family. It was described by William D. Kearfott in 1907. It is found in North America, where it has been recorded from Washington to Colorado, Arizona and California and across southern Canada to Maine.

The wingspan is 14–19 mm for males and 13–18 mm for females.

The larvae bore into the limbs of Prunus and Quercus species.
