= Carposina loxolopha =

Scientific classification
- Kingdom: Animalia
- Phylum: Arthropoda
- Clade: Pancrustacea
- Class: Insecta
- Order: Lepidoptera
- Family: Carposinidae
- Genus: Carposina
- Species: C. loxolopha

Binomial name
- Carposina loxolopha Turner, 1947

Species of moth

Carposina loxolopha is a moth in the Carposinidae family. It was described by Turner in 1947. It is found in Australia, where it has been recorded from Western Australia.
