= Carposina mediella =

Scientific classification
- Kingdom: Animalia
- Phylum: Arthropoda
- Clade: Pancrustacea
- Class: Insecta
- Order: Lepidoptera
- Family: Carposinidae
- Genus: Carposina
- Species: C. mediella

Binomial name
- Carposina mediella (Walker, 1866)

Synonyms
- Enopa mediella Walker, 1866; Oistophora pterocosmana Meyrick, 1881; Carposina ceramophanes Turner, 1947

Species of moth

Carposina mediella is a moth in the Carposinidae family. It was described by Francis Walker in 1866. It is found in Australia, where it has been recorded from Tasmania, South Australia, New South Wales, Victoria, Queensland and Western Australia.
