= Carposina zymota =

Scientific classification
- Kingdom: Animalia
- Phylum: Arthropoda
- Clade: Pancrustacea
- Class: Insecta
- Order: Lepidoptera
- Family: Carposinidae
- Genus: Carposina
- Species: C. zymota

Binomial name
- Carposina zymota (Meyrick, 1910)

Synonyms
- Meridarchis zymota Meyrick, 1910

Species of moth

Carposina zymota is a moth in the family Carposinidae. It was described by Edward Meyrick in 1910. It is found on New Guinea and northern Australia.
