= Carposina smaragdias =

Scientific classification
- Kingdom: Animalia
- Phylum: Arthropoda
- Clade: Pancrustacea
- Class: Insecta
- Order: Lepidoptera
- Family: Carposinidae
- Genus: Carposina
- Species: C. smaragdias

Binomial name
- Carposina smaragdias Turner, 1916

Species of moth

Carposina smaragdias is a moth in the Carposinidae family. It was described by Turner in 1916. It is found in Australia, where it has been recorded from Queensland.

The wingspan is about 31 mm.
