= Carposina leptoneura =

Scientific classification
- Kingdom: Animalia
- Phylum: Arthropoda
- Clade: Pancrustacea
- Class: Insecta
- Order: Lepidoptera
- Family: Carposinidae
- Genus: Carposina
- Species: C. leptoneura

Binomial name
- Carposina leptoneura Meyrick, 1920

Species of moth

Carposina leptoneura is a moth in the family Carposinidae. It was described by Edward Meyrick in 1920. It is found in Australia, where it has been recorded from Western Australia.
