= Carposina perileuca =

Scientific classification
- Kingdom: Animalia
- Phylum: Arthropoda
- Clade: Pancrustacea
- Class: Insecta
- Order: Lepidoptera
- Family: Carposinidae
- Genus: Carposina
- Species: C. perileuca

Binomial name
- Carposina perileuca (Lower, 1908)

Synonyms
- Paramorpha perileuca Lower, 1908

Species of moth

Carposina perileuca is a moth in the family Carposinidae. It was described by Oswald Bertram Lower in 1908. It is found in Australia.
