= Carposina tanaoptera =

Scientific classification
- Kingdom: Animalia
- Phylum: Arthropoda
- Clade: Pancrustacea
- Class: Insecta
- Order: Lepidoptera
- Family: Carposinidae
- Genus: Carposina
- Species: C. tanaoptera

Binomial name
- Carposina tanaoptera Turner, 1947

Species of moth

Carposina tanaoptera is a moth in the Carposinidae family. It was described by Turner in 1947.

== Distribution ==
It is found in Australia, where it has been recorded from Tasmania.
