= Carposina chaetolopha =

Scientific classification
- Kingdom: Animalia
- Phylum: Arthropoda
- Clade: Pancrustacea
- Class: Insecta
- Order: Lepidoptera
- Family: Carposinidae
- Genus: Carposina
- Species: C. chaetolopha

Binomial name
- Carposina chaetolopha Turner, 1926

Synonyms
- Carposina dascioptera Turner, 1947

Species of moth

Carposina chaetolopha is a moth in the Carposinidae family. It was described by Alfred Jefferis Turner in 1926. It is found in Australia.
