= Carposina hyperlopha =

Scientific classification
- Kingdom: Animalia
- Phylum: Arthropoda
- Clade: Pancrustacea
- Class: Insecta
- Order: Lepidoptera
- Family: Carposinidae
- Genus: Carposina
- Species: C. hyperlopha

Binomial name
- Carposina hyperlopha Turner, 1947

Synonyms
- Carposina poliosticha Turner, 1947

Species of moth

Carposina hyperlopha is a moth in the Carposinidae family. It was described by Turner in 1947. It is found in Australia, where it has been recorded from New South Wales and Queensland.
