= Carposina nesolocha =

Scientific classification
- Kingdom: Animalia
- Phylum: Arthropoda
- Clade: Pancrustacea
- Class: Insecta
- Order: Lepidoptera
- Family: Carposinidae
- Genus: Carposina
- Species: C. nesolocha

Binomial name
- Carposina nesolocha Meyrick, 1910

Species of moth

Carposina nesolocha is a moth in the family Carposinidae. It was described by Edward Meyrick in 1910. It is found in Australia, where it has been recorded from Western Australia.
