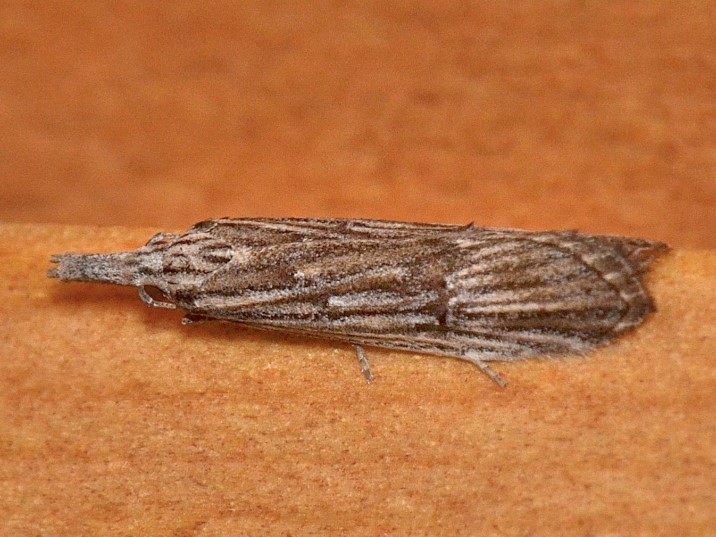

Scientific classification
- Kingdom: Animalia
- Phylum: Arthropoda
- Clade: Pancrustacea
- Class: Insecta
- Order: Lepidoptera
- Family: Carposinidae
- Genus: Carposina
- Species: C. neurophorella

Binomial name
- Carposina neurophorella (Meyrick, 1879)

Synonyms
- Epischnia neurophorella Meyrick, 1879

= Carposina neurophorella =

Species of moth

Carposina neurophorella is a moth in the family Carposinidae. It was described by Edward Meyrick in 1879. It is found in Australia, where it has been recorded from South Australia. The species is also found in New Zealand.
