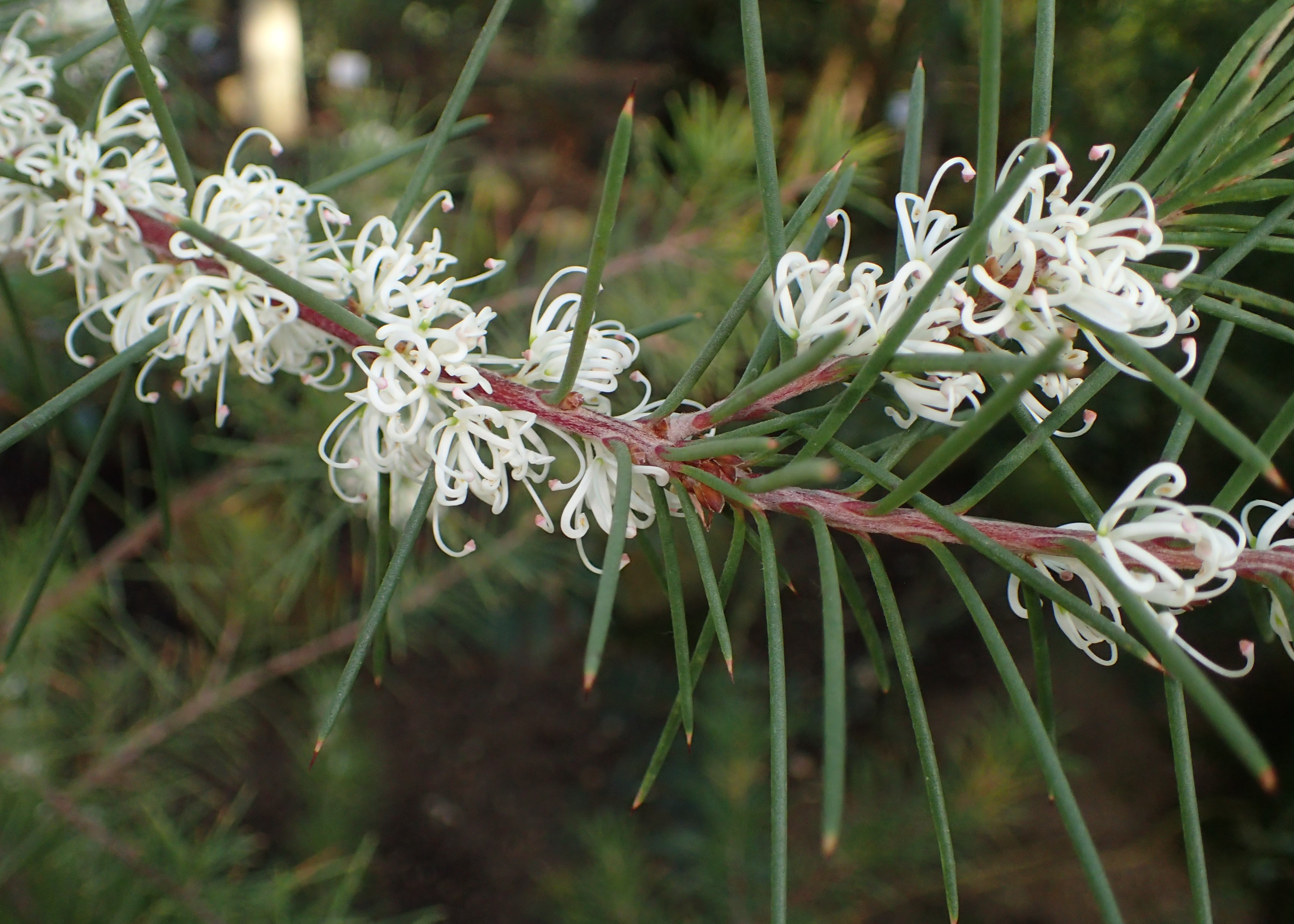
- Hakea sericea in Berlin Botanical Garden

Scientific classification
- Kingdom: Plantae
- Clade: Tracheophytes
- Clade: Angiosperms
- Clade: Eudicots
- Order: Proteales
- Family: Proteaceae
- Genus: Hakea
- Species: H. sericea

Binomial name
- Hakea sericea Schrad. & J.C.Wendl.
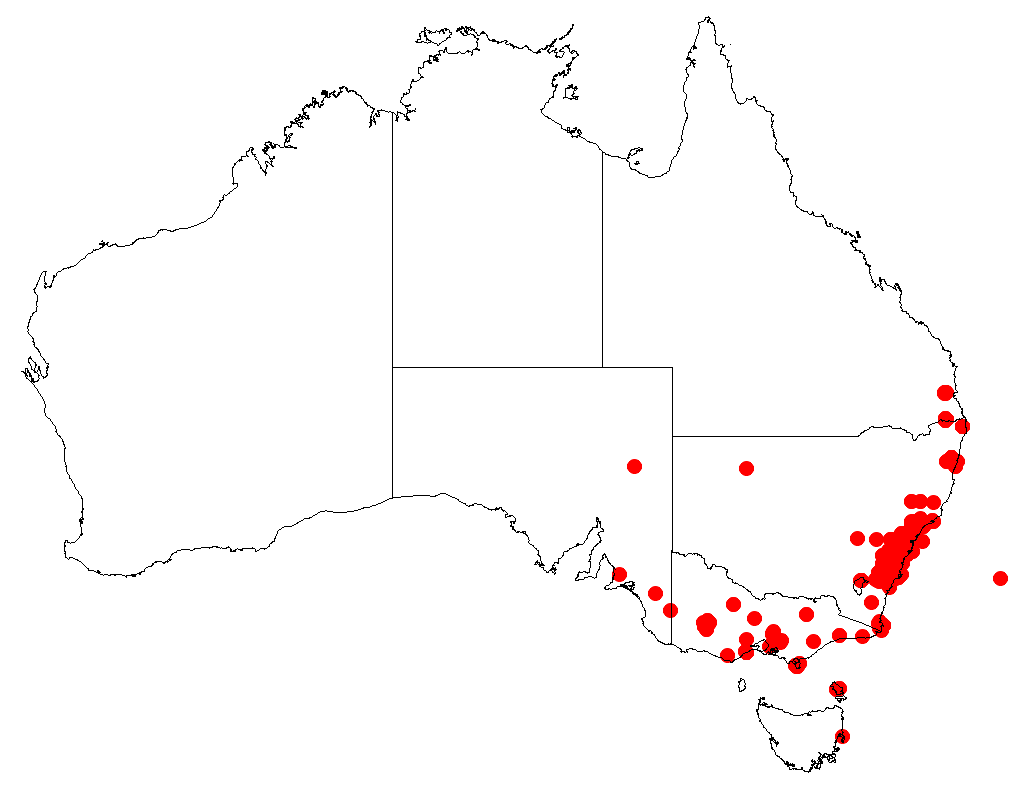
- Occurrence data from Australasian Virtual Herbarium

= Hakea sericea =

Bushy needlewood

Species of plant

Hakea sericea, commonly known as bushy needlewood or silky hakea, is a shrub with a profusion of mainly white flowers from July for several months. It is endemic to eastern Australia. It has become an environmental weed in some countries.

== Description ==
Hakea sericea is a large spreading, bushy shrub and may grow to 4 m (10 ft) and does not form a lignotuber. The branchlets are densely covered in grey-whitish short, soft, woolly hairs. The inflorescence appear in umbels of 1–6 flowers in leaf axils, pinkish in bud and maturing to white. The inflorescence rachis is 0.5–2.5 mm (0.020–0.098 in) long and thickly covered in woolly, short, matted white hairs toward the end and rusty coloured at the base. The pedicels are 2–4 mm (0.079–0.157 in) long, slight to densely covered with long white hairs. The smooth perianth is 2.5–4.7 mm (0.098–0.185 in) long and the pistil 4–7.5 mm (0.16–0.30 in) long. The needle-shaped leaves are grooved on the undersurface and up to 7 cm (3 in) long and 0.7–1.3 mm (0.03–0.05 in) wide and ending in a sharp point 1–2 mm (0.039–0.079 in) long. The leaves are moderately covered with flattened silky hairs, quickly becoming smooth. The fruit are rough and coarsely wrinkled with a network of veins on the surface, 2.5–3 cm (1–1 in) long and 2 cm (0.8 in) wide ending with a short, broad beak to 3 mm (0.12 in) long.

== Taxonomy and naming ==
Hakea sericea was first formally described by Heinrich Schrader and Johann Christoph Wendland in 1797 and published the description in Sertum Hannoveranum. The genus Hakea is named after Baron von Hake, patron of botany in the 18th century. Sericea meaning silky, referring to the tiny hairs on young growth.

== Distribution and habitat ==
Silky hakea is found from the coast and adjacent ranges of south-eastern Queensland to south-eastern New South Wales. A frost tolerant species, grows in well-drained soil and full sun. A good habitat plant due to its prickly habit and winter flowering. It is also naturalised in Victoria and possibly South Australia.

H. sericea is an invasive weed in some areas outside Australia, specifically in South Africa, New Zealand and Portugal.

In the European Union, due to the significant negative impacts of its introduction to the ecosystem, it is included in the list of invasive alien species of Union concern and hence cannot be imported, bred, transported, commercialized, or intentionally released into the environment in any of its member states.
