= Paramorpha aplegia =

Scientific classification
- Kingdom: Animalia
- Phylum: Arthropoda
- Clade: Pancrustacea
- Class: Insecta
- Order: Lepidoptera
- Family: Carposinidae
- Genus: Paramorpha
- Species: P. aplegia

Binomial name
- Paramorpha aplegia (Turner, 1916)

Synonyms
- Carposina aplegia Turner, 1916

Species of moth

Paramorpha aplegia is a moth in the Carposinidae family. It was described by Turner in 1916. It is found in Australia, where it has been recorded from New South Wales.

The wingspan is about 18 mm. The forewings whitish grey, with some darker grey irroration towards the dorsum and termen. The hindwings are whitish.
