= Carposina petraea =

Scientific classification
- Kingdom: Animalia
- Phylum: Arthropoda
- Clade: Pancrustacea
- Class: Insecta
- Order: Lepidoptera
- Family: Carposinidae
- Genus: Carposina
- Species: C. petraea

Binomial name
- Carposina petraea Meyrick, 1910

Synonyms
- Carposina eulopha Turner, 1916

Species of moth

Carposina petraea is a moth in the family Carposinidae. It was described by Edward Meyrick in 1910. It is found in Australia, where it has been recorded from South Australia and Victoria.

The wingspan is about 18 mm. The forewings are whitish, unevenly suffused with grey and with ochreous, and irrorated (sprinkled) with dark fuscous. The hindwings are whitish grey.
