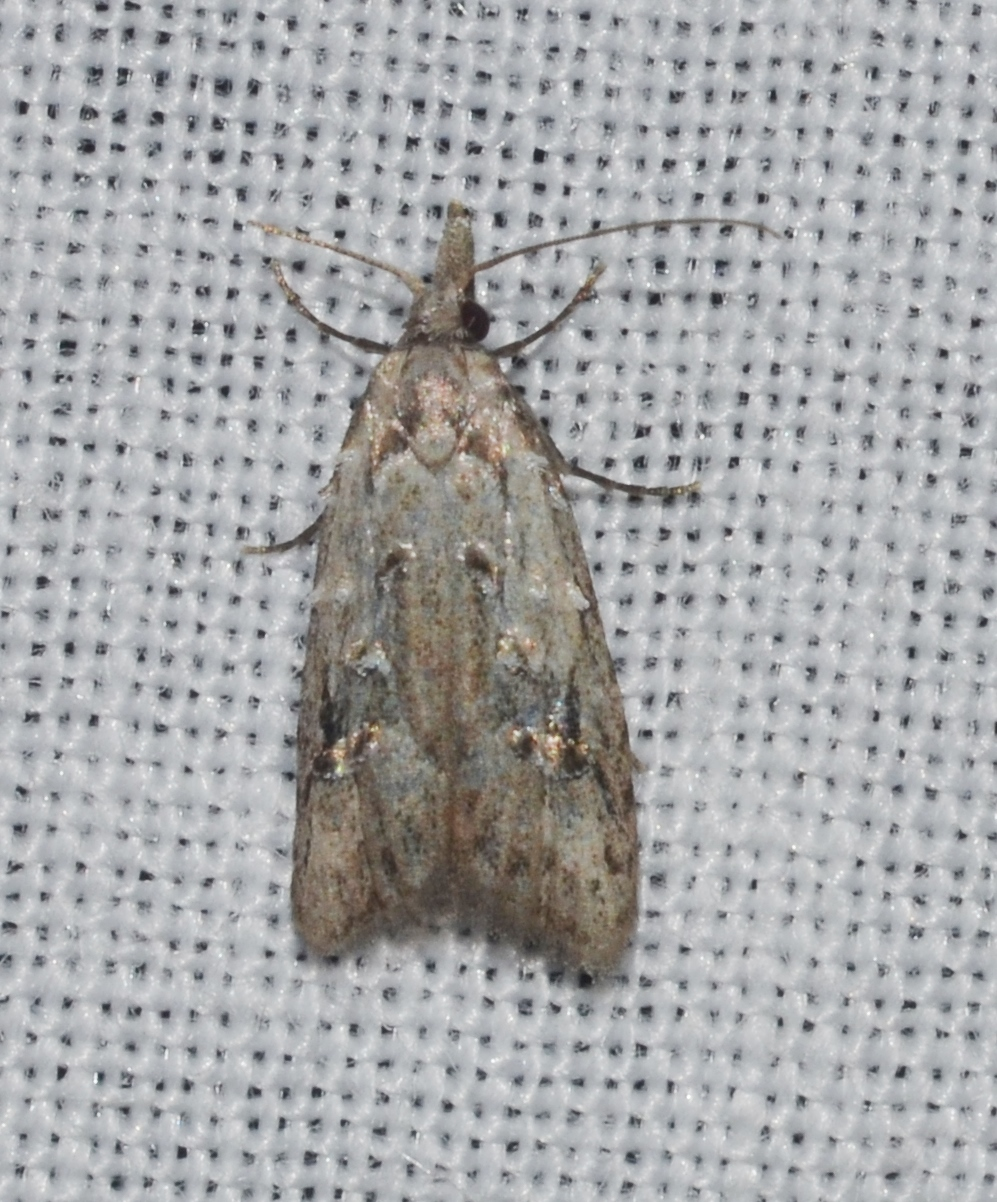

Scientific classification
- Kingdom: Animalia
- Phylum: Arthropoda
- Clade: Pancrustacea
- Class: Insecta
- Order: Lepidoptera
- Family: Carposinidae
- Genus: Carposina
- Species: C. sasakii

Binomial name
- Carposina sasakii Matsumura, 1900

Synonyms
- Carpocapsa percicana Matsumura, 1899; Carposina percicana; Carposina persicana; Cydia persicana

= Carposina sasakii =

Species of moth

The peach fruit moth (Carposina sasakii) is a species of moth of the Carposinidae family. It is endemic to large parts of Asia, including Japan, Korea, China and Russia (Amur Oblast, Khabarovsk Krai, Primorsky Krai).

The wingspan is 13–17 mm.

== Taxonomy ==
Carposina sasakii
