= Anomoeosis barbara =

Scientific classification
- Kingdom: Animalia
- Phylum: Arthropoda
- Class: Insecta
- Order: Lepidoptera
- Family: Carposinidae
- Genus: Anomoeosis
- Species: A. barbara

Binomial name
- Anomoeosis barbara Diakonoff, 1954

Species of moth

Anomoeosis barbara is a moth in the Carposinidae family. It was described by Alexey Diakonoff in 1954. It is found in New Guinea.
