= Heterogymna ochrogramma =

Scientific classification
- Kingdom: Animalia
- Phylum: Arthropoda
- Class: Insecta
- Order: Lepidoptera
- Family: Carposinidae
- Genus: Heterogymna
- Species: H. ochrogramma

Binomial name
- Heterogymna ochrogramma Meyrick, 1913

Synonyms
- Heterogymna coloba Diakonoff, 1989; Psecadia seriatopunctata Matsumura, 1931; Heterogymna toxotes Diakonoff, 1989

Species of moth

Heterogymna ochrogramma is a moth in the family Carposinidae. It was described by Edward Meyrick in 1913. It is found in Bhutan, China and Japan.
