= Archostola tianmushana =

Scientific classification
- Kingdom: Animalia
- Phylum: Arthropoda
- Class: Insecta
- Order: Lepidoptera
- Family: Carposinidae
- Genus: Archostola
- Species: A. tianmushana

Binomial name
- Archostola tianmushana Li, Wang & Dong, 2001

Species of moth

Archostola tianmushana is a moth in the Carposinidae family. It was described by Hun in 2001. It is found in China.
