= Blipta xylinarcha =

Scientific classification
- Kingdom: Animalia
- Phylum: Arthropoda
- Class: Insecta
- Order: Lepidoptera
- Family: Carposinidae
- Genus: Blipta
- Species: B. xylinarcha

Binomial name
- Blipta xylinarcha (Meyrick, 1930)

Synonyms
- Bondia xylinarcha Meyrick, 1930

Species of moth

Blipta xylinarcha is a moth in the family Carposinidae. It was described by Edward Meyrick in 1930. It is found on New Guinea.
