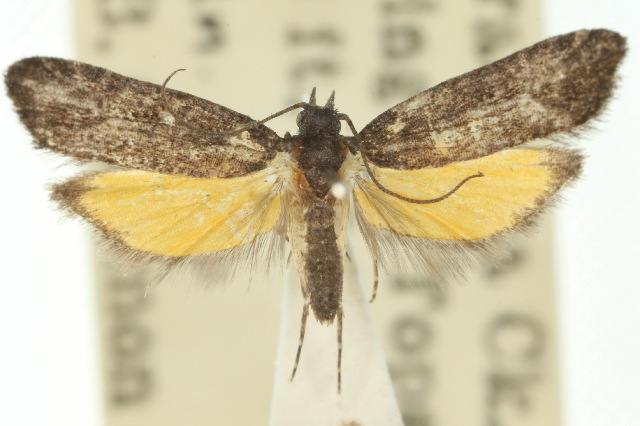

Scientific classification
- Kingdom: Animalia
- Phylum: Arthropoda
- Class: Insecta
- Order: Lepidoptera
- Family: Carposinidae
- Genus: Bondia
- Species: B. dissolutana

Binomial name
- Bondia dissolutana Meyrick, 1882

= Bondia dissolutana =

Species of moth

Bondia dissolutana is a moth in the family Carposinidae. It was described by Edward Meyrick in 1882. It is found in Australia, where it has been recorded from New South Wales.
