= Heterogymna chorospila =

Scientific classification
- Kingdom: Animalia
- Phylum: Arthropoda
- Class: Insecta
- Order: Lepidoptera
- Family: Carposinidae
- Genus: Heterogymna
- Species: H. chorospila

Binomial name
- Heterogymna chorospila Meyrick, 1922

Species of moth

Heterogymna chorospila is a moth in the family Carposinidae. It was described by Edward Meyrick in 1922. It is found on Java in Indonesia.

The wingspan is about 28 mm. The forewings are grey whitish. The base white, with black subbasal spots in the middle and near the dorsum, and the costal edge is blackish towards the base. The hindwings are grey whitish, but greyish tinged towards the apex.
