= Paramorpha injusta =

Scientific classification
- Kingdom: Animalia
- Phylum: Arthropoda
- Class: Insecta
- Order: Lepidoptera
- Family: Carposinidae
- Genus: Paramorpha
- Species: P. injusta

Binomial name
- Paramorpha injusta Meyrick, 1913

Species of moth

Paramorpha injusta is a moth in the Carposinidae family. It is found in Australia, where it has been recorded from New South Wales.
