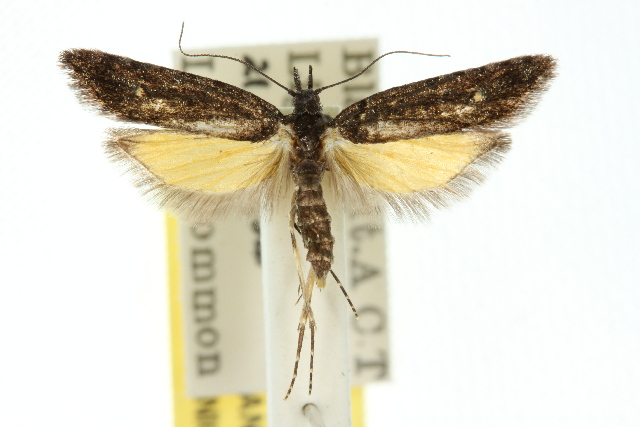

Scientific classification
- Kingdom: Animalia
- Phylum: Arthropoda
- Class: Insecta
- Order: Lepidoptera
- Family: Carposinidae
- Genus: Bondia
- Species: B. caseata

Binomial name
- Bondia caseata Meyrick, 1910

= Bondia caseata =

Species of moth

Bondia caseata is a moth in the family Carposinidae. It was described by Edward Meyrick in 1910. It is found in Australia, where it has been recorded from Victoria and South Australia.
