= Mesodica infuscata =

Scientific classification
- Kingdom: Animalia
- Phylum: Arthropoda
- Class: Insecta
- Order: Lepidoptera
- Family: Carposinidae
- Genus: Mesodica
- Species: M. infuscata

Binomial name
- Mesodica infuscata Diakonoff, 1949

Species of moth

Mesodica infuscata is a moth in the family Carposinidae. It is found on Java.
