= Mesodica dryas =

Scientific classification
- Kingdom: Animalia
- Phylum: Arthropoda
- Class: Insecta
- Order: Lepidoptera
- Family: Carposinidae
- Genus: Mesodica
- Species: M. dryas

Binomial name
- Mesodica dryas (Diakonoff, 1950)

Synonyms
- Meridarchis dryas Diakonoff, 1950

Species of moth

Mesodica dryas is a moth in the Carposinidae family. It is found in India (Assam).
