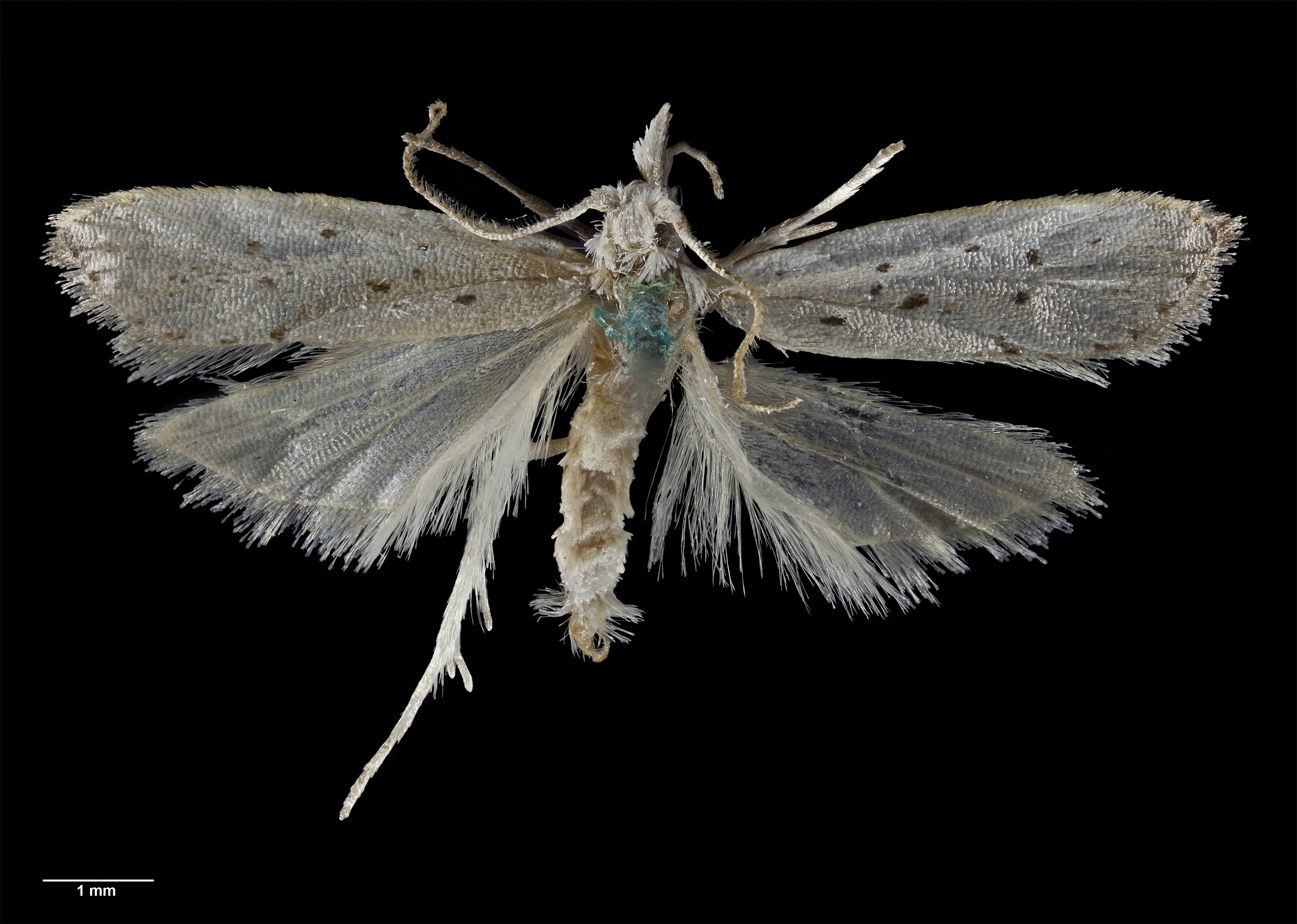
- Male holotype specimen

Scientific classification
- Kingdom: Animalia
- Phylum: Arthropoda
- Class: Insecta
- Order: Lepidoptera
- Family: Carposinidae
- Genus: Paramorpha
- Species: P. marginata

Binomial name
- Paramorpha marginata (Philpott, 1931)

Synonyms
- Carposina marginata Philpott, 1931; Paramorpha heptacentra Meyrick, 1931

= Paramorpha marginata =

Species of moth

Paramorpha marginata is a species of moth in the family Carposinidae. It is endemic to New Zealand and has been observed in the northern parts of the North Island. Adults are on the wing in September, December and January. It has been observed in the canopy of kanuka forest and has been collected and reared from leaf litter beneath Leucopogon fasciculatus. It is regarded as a rarely recorded species.

== Taxonomy ==
This species was described by Alfred Philpott in 1931 using a specimen collected by Charles Edwin Clarke at Okoroire in December and named Carposina marginata. Later in 1931 Edward Meyrick, thinking he was describing a new species, named it Paramorpha heptacentra. This name along with the original combination were synonymised by George Hudson in his 1939 book A supplement to the butterflies and moths of New Zealand. Hudson illustrated and described the species under the current nomenclature. The male holotype specimen is held at the Auckland War Memorial Museum.

== Description ==
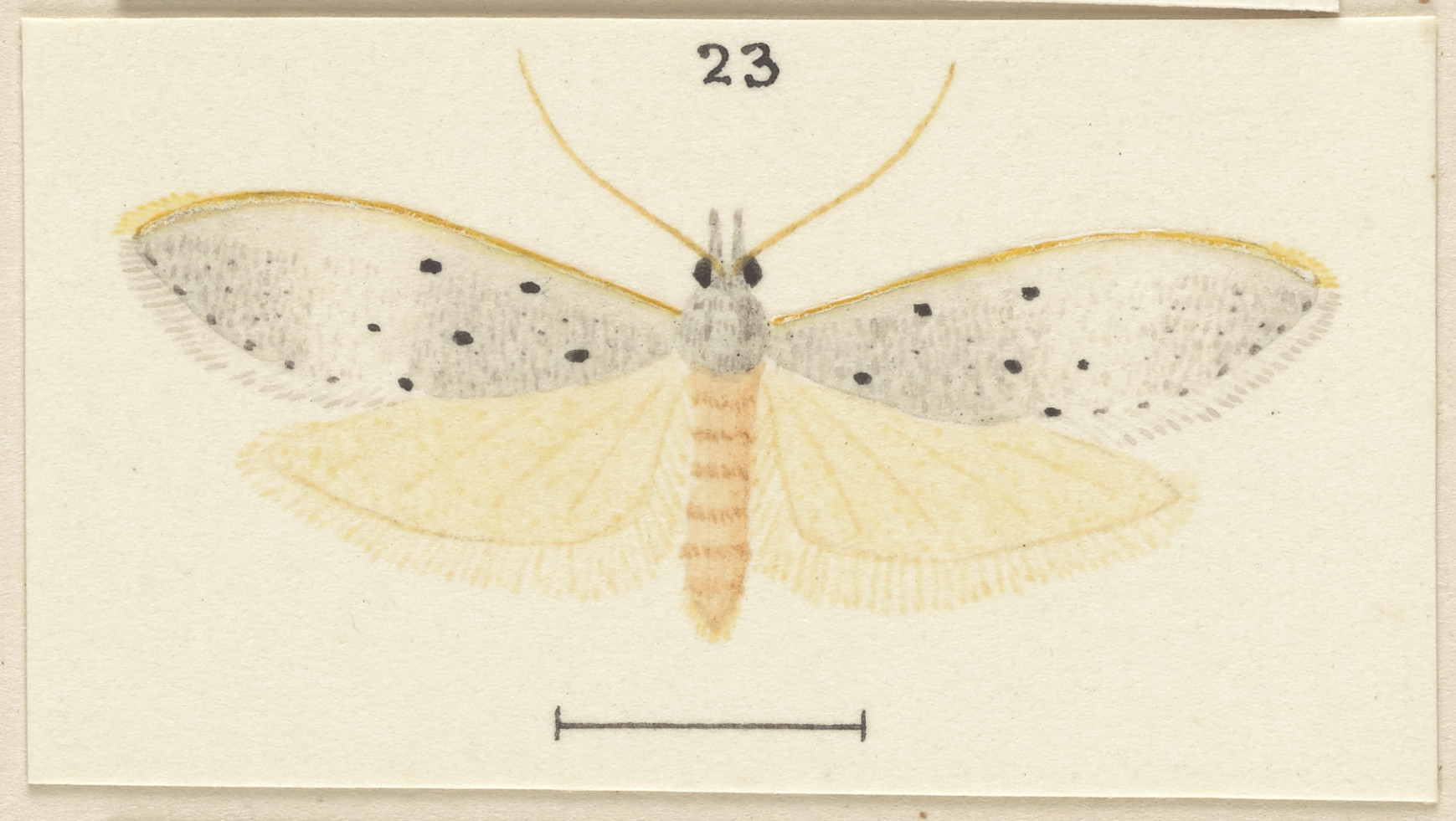
Illustration of P. marginata

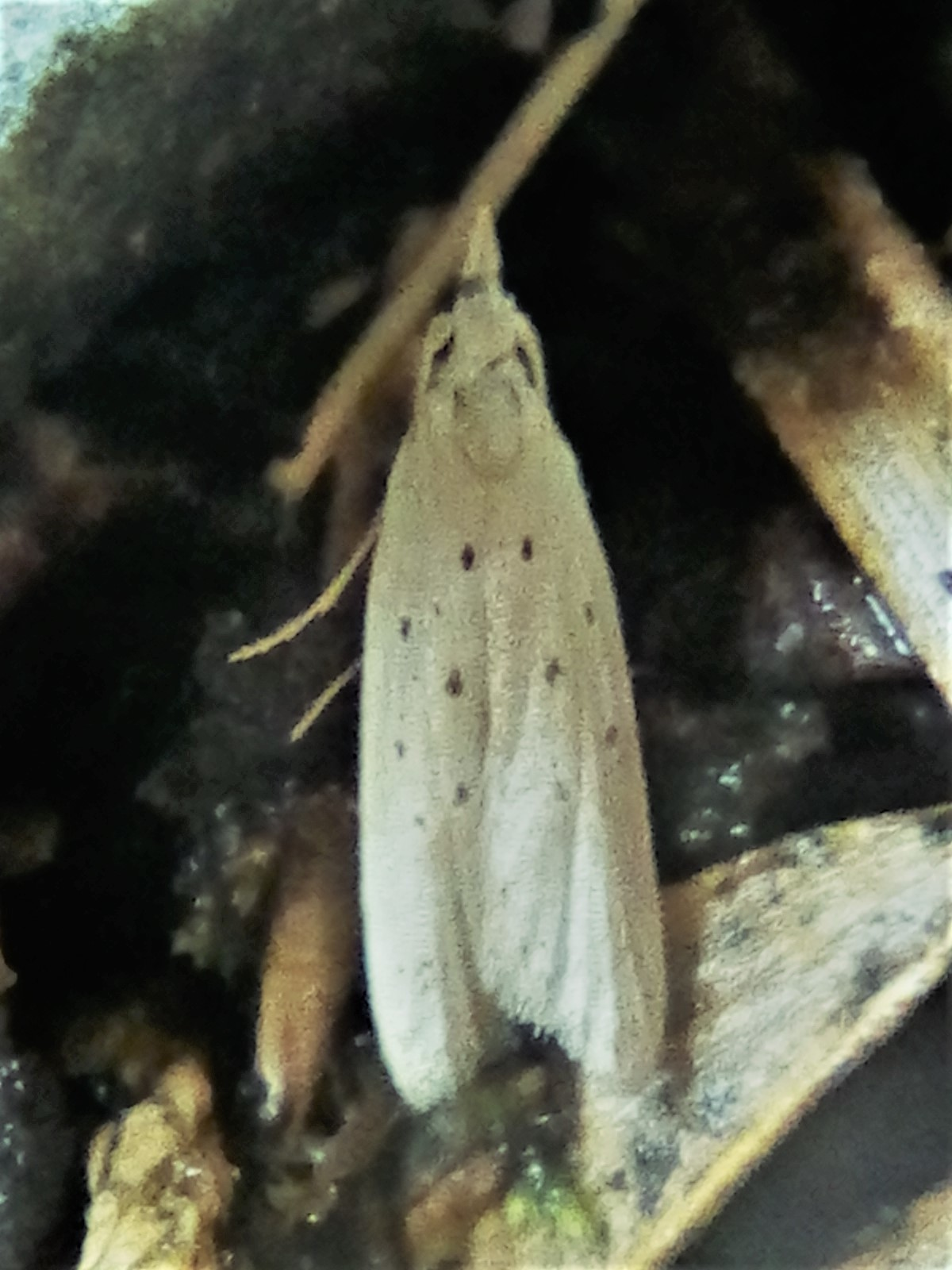
Observation of live P. marginata

Philpott described the species as follows:

♂. 11 mm. Head and thorax white. Palpi white, fuscous laterally and beneath. Antennae white, ciliations in ♂ 2. Abdomen ochreous white. Legs fuscous mixed with whitish, posterior pair white. Forewings with costa moderately arched, apex rather angular, termen rounded, oblique; white, rather greyish except along costa; extreme edge of costa yellow more dilated on apical ½; markings black; a spot below fold at ¼; a spot well below costa at about ¼ and another immediately beneath it; a large spot just above fold not far beyond the latter; a spot below costa at ½; beyond this a spot in disc and another beneath and obliquely before it; a chain of spots round termen and a number of single black scales scattered about apical half of wing: fringes grey. Hindwings and fringes shining white.

== Distribution ==
This species is endemic to New Zealand. Hudson was of the opinion that the species could be found in the northern parts of the North island. Other than Okoroire, this species has been collected in Albany in Auckland, Whangarei, and at the Poor Knights Islands.

== Biology and behaviour ==
This species is on the wing in September, December and January. This species has been collected using a malaise trap as well as being beaten from foliage. This species is regarded as being rarely recorded.

== Habitat and host species ==
This moth has been found to be present in the canopy of kanuka stands. P. marginata has been collected and reared from litter beneath Leucopogon fasciculatus.
