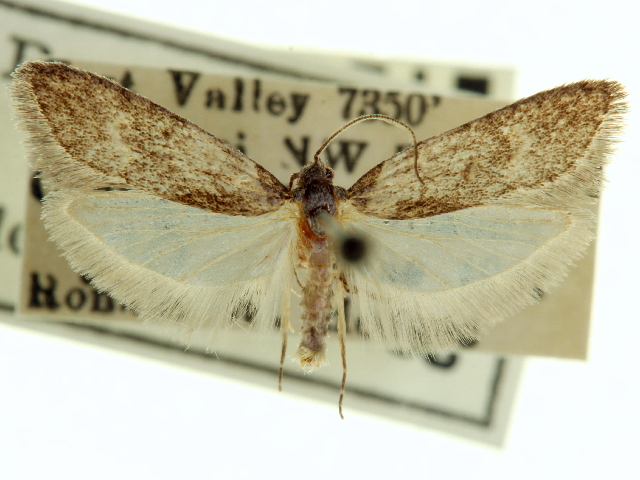

Scientific classification
- Kingdom: Animalia
- Phylum: Arthropoda
- Class: Insecta
- Order: Lepidoptera
- Family: Carposinidae
- Genus: Bondia
- Species: B. fidelis

Binomial name
- Bondia fidelis Meyrick, 1913

= Bondia fidelis =

Species of moth

Bondia fidelis is a moth in the family Carposinidae. It was described by Edward Meyrick in 1913. It is found in North America, where it has been recorded from Arizona and Colorado.

Adults have been recorded on wing from July to August.
