= Heterogymna metarsia =

Scientific classification
- Domain: Eukaryota
- Kingdom: Animalia
- Phylum: Arthropoda
- Class: Insecta
- Order: Lepidoptera
- Family: Carposinidae
- Genus: Heterogymna
- Species: H. metarsia

Binomial name
- Heterogymna metarsia Diakonoff, 1989

Species of moth

Heterogymna metarsia is a moth in the Carposinidae family. It was described by Alexey Diakonoff in 1989. It is found in India (Sikkim).
