= Metacosmesis xerostola =

Scientific classification
- Domain: Eukaryota
- Kingdom: Animalia
- Phylum: Arthropoda
- Class: Insecta
- Order: Lepidoptera
- Family: Carposinidae
- Genus: Metacosmesis
- Species: M. xerostola

Binomial name
- Metacosmesis xerostola Diakonoff, 1983

Species of moth

Metacosmesis xerostola is a moth in the Carposinidae family. It is found in Saudi Arabia.
