= Archostola niphauge =

Scientific classification
- Kingdom: Animalia
- Phylum: Arthropoda
- Class: Insecta
- Order: Lepidoptera
- Family: Carposinidae
- Genus: Archostola
- Species: A. niphauge

Binomial name
- Archostola niphauge Diakonoff, 1989

Species of moth

Archostola niphauge is a moth in the Carposinidae family. It was described by Alexey Diakonoff in 1989. It is found in China (Yunnan).
