= Heterogymna zacentra =

Scientific classification
- Kingdom: Animalia
- Phylum: Arthropoda
- Class: Insecta
- Order: Lepidoptera
- Family: Carposinidae
- Genus: Heterogymna
- Species: H. zacentra

Binomial name
- Heterogymna zacentra Meyrick, 1913

Species of moth

Heterogymna zacentra is a moth in the family Carposinidae. It was described by Edward Meyrick in 1913. It is found in India.
