= Archostola ocytoma =

Scientific classification
- Kingdom: Animalia
- Phylum: Arthropoda
- Class: Insecta
- Order: Lepidoptera
- Family: Carposinidae
- Genus: Archostola
- Species: A. ocytoma

Binomial name
- Archostola ocytoma (Meyrick, 1938)

Synonyms
- Meridarchis ocytoma Meyrick, 1938

Species of moth

Archostola ocytoma is a moth in the family Carposinidae. It was described by Edward Meyrick in 1938. It is found in Yunnan, China.
