= Archostola tredecim =

Scientific classification
- Kingdom: Animalia
- Phylum: Arthropoda
- Class: Insecta
- Order: Lepidoptera
- Family: Carposinidae
- Genus: Archostola
- Species: A. tredecim

Binomial name
- Archostola tredecim Diakonoff, 1949

Species of moth

Archostola tredecim is a moth in the Carposinidae family. It was described by Alexey Diakonoff in 1949. It is found on Sumatra.
