= Heterogymna collegialis =

Scientific classification
- Kingdom: Animalia
- Phylum: Arthropoda
- Class: Insecta
- Order: Lepidoptera
- Family: Carposinidae
- Genus: Heterogymna
- Species: H. collegialis

Binomial name
- Heterogymna collegialis Meyrick, 1925

Species of moth

Heterogymna collegialis is a moth in the family Carposinidae. It was described by Edward Meyrick in 1925. It is found on New Guinea.
