= Metacosmesis illodis =

Scientific classification
- Kingdom: Animalia
- Phylum: Arthropoda
- Class: Insecta
- Order: Lepidoptera
- Family: Carposinidae
- Genus: Metacosmesis
- Species: M. illodis

Binomial name
- Metacosmesis illodis Diakonoff, 1967

Species of moth

Metacosmesis illodis is a moth in the Carposinidae family. It is found in the Philippines (Luzon).
