= Heterogymna cheesmanae =

Scientific classification
- Domain: Eukaryota
- Kingdom: Animalia
- Phylum: Arthropoda
- Class: Insecta
- Order: Lepidoptera
- Family: Carposinidae
- Genus: Heterogymna
- Species: H. cheesmanae

Binomial name
- Heterogymna cheesmanae Bradley, 1962

Species of moth

Heterogymna cheesmanae is a moth in the Carposinidae family. It was described by John David Bradley in 1962 and is found on the New Hebrides.
