= Heterogymna melanococca =

Scientific classification
- Domain: Eukaryota
- Kingdom: Animalia
- Phylum: Arthropoda
- Class: Insecta
- Order: Lepidoptera
- Family: Carposinidae
- Genus: Heterogymna
- Species: H. melanococca

Binomial name
- Heterogymna melanococca Diakonoff, 1954

Species of moth

Heterogymna melanococca is a moth in the Carposinidae family. It was described by Alexey Diakonoff in 1954. It is found in New Guinea.
