= Actenoptila eucosma =

Scientific classification
- Domain: Eukaryota
- Kingdom: Animalia
- Phylum: Arthropoda
- Class: Insecta
- Order: Lepidoptera
- Family: Carposinidae
- Genus: Actenoptila
- Species: A. eucosma

Binomial name
- Actenoptila eucosma Diakonoff, 1954

Species of moth

Actenoptila eucosma is a moth in the Carposinidae family. It was described by Alexey Diakonoff in 1954. It is found in New Guinea.

== External sites ==
- Natural History Museum Lepidoptera generic names catalog
