= Bondia fuscata =

Scientific classification
- Kingdom: Animalia
- Phylum: Arthropoda
- Class: Insecta
- Order: Lepidoptera
- Family: Carposinidae
- Genus: Bondia
- Species: B. fuscata

Binomial name
- Bondia fuscata Davis, 1969

Species of moth

Bondia fuscata is a moth in the Carposinidae family. It was described by Davis in 1969. It is found in North America, where it has been recorded from Arizona.

Adults have been recorded on wing from July to August.
