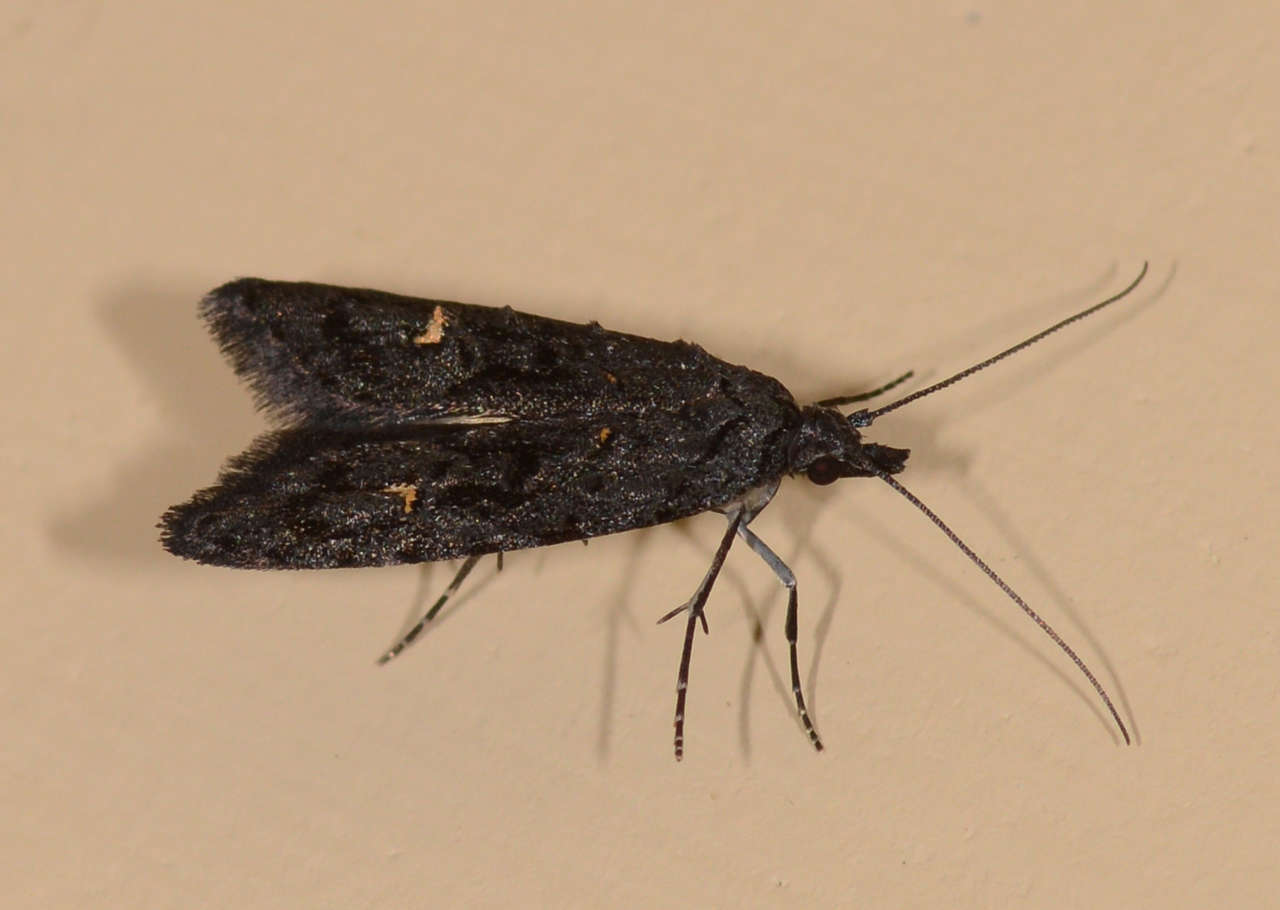

Scientific classification
- Kingdom: Animalia
- Phylum: Arthropoda
- Clade: Pancrustacea
- Class: Insecta
- Order: Lepidoptera
- Family: Carposinidae
- Genus: Bondia
- Species: B. nigella

Binomial name
- Bondia nigella Newman, 1856

= Bondia nigella =

Species of moth

Bondia nigella is a moth in the family Carposinidae. It was described by Newman in 1856. It is found in Australia, where it has been recorded from the eastern part of the country and Tasmania.
