= Metacosmesis aelinopa =

Scientific classification
- Kingdom: Animalia
- Phylum: Arthropoda
- Class: Insecta
- Order: Lepidoptera
- Family: Carposinidae
- Genus: Metacosmesis
- Species: M. aelinopa

Binomial name
- Metacosmesis aelinopa Diakonoff, 1982

Species of moth

Metacosmesis aelinopa is a moth in the family Carposinidae first described by Alexey Diakonoff in 1982. It is found in Sri Lanka.

== Description ==
The wingspan of an adult male is 16 mm. Head whitish. Antenna brownish. Palpus dark fuscous base to snow-white apex. Thorax and tegula creamy. Abdomen white. Forewings long and narrow. Costa concave with a pointed apex. Termen strongly oblique. Forewings are Whitish with light grayish-fuscous suffusion. Markings are fuscous and black. Cilia creamy white. Hindwings silvery. Cilia white which becomes creamy towards the apex.
