= Picrorrhyncha atribasis =

Scientific classification
- Domain: Eukaryota
- Kingdom: Animalia
- Phylum: Arthropoda
- Class: Insecta
- Order: Lepidoptera
- Family: Carposinidae
- Genus: Picrorrhyncha
- Species: P. atribasis

Binomial name
- Picrorrhyncha atribasis Diakonoff, 1950

Species of moth

Picrorrhyncha atribasis is a moth in the Carposinidae family. It was described by Alexey Diakonoff in 1950. It is found in Punjab, India.
