= Heterogymna pardalota =

Scientific classification
- Kingdom: Animalia
- Phylum: Arthropoda
- Class: Insecta
- Order: Lepidoptera
- Family: Carposinidae
- Genus: Heterogymna
- Species: H. pardalota

Binomial name
- Heterogymna pardalota Meyrick, 1922

Species of moth

Heterogymna pardalota is a moth in the family Carposinidae. It was described by Edward Meyrick in 1922. It is found in Assam, India.
