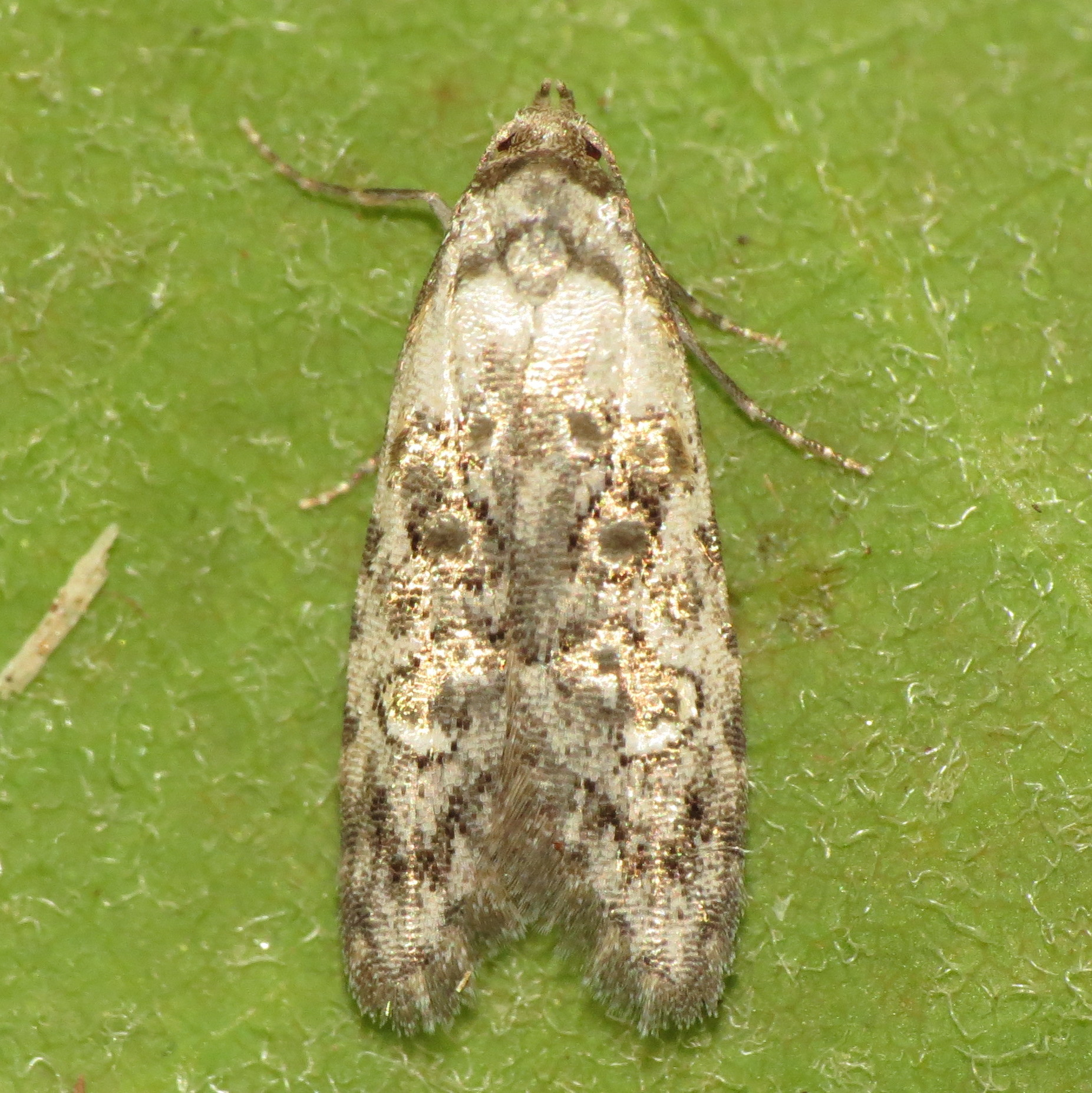

Scientific classification
- Kingdom: Animalia
- Phylum: Arthropoda
- Clade: Pancrustacea
- Class: Insecta
- Order: Lepidoptera
- Family: Carposinidae
- Genus: Bondia
- Species: B. crescentella

Binomial name
- Bondia crescentella (Walsingham, 1882)

Synonyms
- Carposina crescentella Walsingham, 1882

= Bondia crescentella =

Species of moth

Bondia crescentella, the crescent-marked bondia, is a moth in the Carposinidae family. It was described by Walsingham in 1882. It is found in North America, where it has been recorded in southern Canada, from British Columbia to Nova Scotia. In the United States, it is found from Minnesota south to Arkansas and east to Virginia.

The wingspan is 11–20 mm (0.43–0.79 in).
