= Heterogymna heptanoma =

Scientific classification
- Kingdom: Animalia
- Phylum: Arthropoda
- Class: Insecta
- Order: Lepidoptera
- Family: Carposinidae
- Genus: Heterogymna
- Species: H. heptanoma

Binomial name
- Heterogymna heptanoma Meyrick, 1925

Species of moth

Heterogymna heptanoma is a moth in the family Carposinidae. It was described by Edward Meyrick in 1925. It is found on Seram in Indonesia.
