= Heterogymna melanocrypta =

Scientific classification
- Domain: Eukaryota
- Kingdom: Animalia
- Phylum: Arthropoda
- Class: Insecta
- Order: Lepidoptera
- Family: Carposinidae
- Genus: Heterogymna
- Species: H. melanocrypta

Binomial name
- Heterogymna melanocrypta Diakonoff, 1967

Species of moth

Heterogymna melanocrypta is a moth in the Carposinidae family. It was described by Alexey Diakonoff in 1967. It is found in the Philippines (Mindanao).
