= Metacosmesis laxeuta =

Scientific classification
- Kingdom: Animalia
- Phylum: Arthropoda
- Class: Insecta
- Order: Lepidoptera
- Family: Carposinidae
- Genus: Metacosmesis
- Species: M. laxeuta

Binomial name
- Metacosmesis laxeuta (Meyrick, 1906)

Synonyms
- Paramorpha laxeuta Meyrick, 1906

Species of moth

Metacosmesis laxeuta is a moth in the Carposinidae family. It is found in Sri Lanka.
