= Metacosmesis barbaroglypha =

Scientific classification
- Kingdom: Animalia
- Phylum: Arthropoda
- Class: Insecta
- Order: Lepidoptera
- Family: Carposinidae
- Genus: Metacosmesis
- Species: M. barbaroglypha

Binomial name
- Metacosmesis barbaroglypha Diakonoff, 1949

Species of moth

Metacosmesis barbaroglypha is a moth in the Carposinidae family. It is found on Java.
