= Mesodica aggerata =

Scientific classification
- Kingdom: Animalia
- Phylum: Arthropoda
- Class: Insecta
- Order: Lepidoptera
- Family: Carposinidae
- Genus: Mesodica
- Species: M. aggerata

Binomial name
- Mesodica aggerata (Meyrick, 1910)

Synonyms
- Meridarchis aggerata Meyrick, 1910

Species of moth

Mesodica aggerata is a moth in the Carposinidae family. It is found on Java.

The wingspan is 22–23 mm (0.87–0.91 in).
