= Picrorrhyncha pista =

Scientific classification
- Domain: Eukaryota
- Kingdom: Animalia
- Phylum: Arthropoda
- Class: Insecta
- Order: Lepidoptera
- Family: Carposinidae
- Genus: Picrorrhyncha
- Species: P. pista

Binomial name
- Picrorrhyncha pista Diakonoff, 1973

Species of moth

Picrorrhyncha pista is a moth in the Carposinidae family. It was described by Alexey Diakonoff in 1973. It is found in Papua New Guinea.
