= Heterogymna gyritis =

Scientific classification
- Kingdom: Animalia
- Phylum: Arthropoda
- Class: Insecta
- Order: Lepidoptera
- Family: Carposinidae
- Genus: Heterogymna
- Species: H. gyritis

Binomial name
- Heterogymna gyritis Meyrick, 1910

Species of moth

Heterogymna gyritis is a moth in the family Carposinidae. It was described by Edward Meyrick in 1910. It is found in Malacca in Malaysia.
