= Paramorpha glandulata =

Scientific classification
- Kingdom: Animalia
- Phylum: Arthropoda
- Class: Insecta
- Order: Lepidoptera
- Family: Carposinidae
- Genus: Paramorpha
- Species: P. glandulata

Binomial name
- Paramorpha glandulata Meyrick, 1922

Species of moth

Paramorpha glandulata is a moth in the Carposinidae family. It is found on Java.
