= Paramorpha cylindrica =

Scientific classification
- Kingdom: Animalia
- Phylum: Arthropoda
- Class: Insecta
- Order: Lepidoptera
- Family: Carposinidae
- Genus: Paramorpha
- Species: P. cylindrica

Binomial name
- Paramorpha cylindrica Meyrick, 1922

Species of moth

Paramorpha cylindrica is a moth in the Carposinidae family. It is found in Australia, where it has been recorded from South Australia.
