= Paramorpha rhachias =

Scientific classification
- Domain: Eukaryota
- Kingdom: Animalia
- Phylum: Arthropoda
- Class: Insecta
- Order: Lepidoptera
- Family: Carposinidae
- Genus: Paramorpha
- Species: P. rhachias

Binomial name
- Paramorpha rhachias Meyrick, 1910

Species of moth

Paramorpha rhachias is a moth in the Carposinidae family. It is found in Australia, where it has been recorded from New South Wales.
