= Paramorpha tenuistria =

Scientific classification
- Domain: Eukaryota
- Kingdom: Animalia
- Phylum: Arthropoda
- Class: Insecta
- Order: Lepidoptera
- Family: Carposinidae
- Genus: Paramorpha
- Species: P. tenuistria

Binomial name
- Paramorpha tenuistria Turner, 1947

Species of moth

Paramorpha tenuistria is a moth in the Carposinidae family. It is found in Australia, where it has been recorded from Western Australia.
