= Bondia spicata =

Scientific classification
- Kingdom: Animalia
- Phylum: Arthropoda
- Class: Insecta
- Order: Lepidoptera
- Family: Carposinidae
- Genus: Bondia
- Species: B. spicata

Binomial name
- Bondia spicata Davis, 1969

Species of moth

Bondia spicata is a moth in the Carposinidae family. It was described by Davis in 1969. It is found in North America, where it has been recorded from California.

Adults have been recorded on wing in May.
