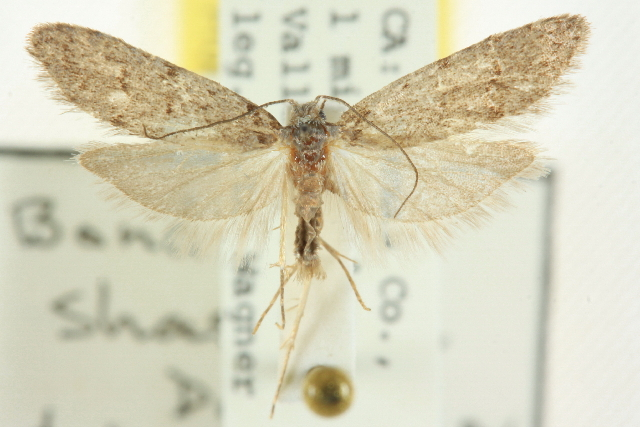

Scientific classification
- Kingdom: Animalia
- Phylum: Arthropoda
- Class: Insecta
- Order: Lepidoptera
- Family: Carposinidae
- Genus: Bondia
- Species: B. shastana

Binomial name
- Bondia shastana Davis, 1969

= Bondia shastana =

Species of moth

Bondia shastana is a moth in the Carposinidae family. It was described by Donald R. Davis in 1969. It is found in North America, where it has been recorded from Oregon, California and Arizona.

The length of the forewings is 6–10 mm. Adults have been recorded on wing in March, from June to July and in September.

== Etymology ==
The species is named for Mount Shasta, the type location.
