= Paramorpha aulata =

Scientific classification
- Kingdom: Animalia
- Phylum: Arthropoda
- Class: Insecta
- Order: Lepidoptera
- Family: Carposinidae
- Genus: Paramorpha
- Species: P. aulata

Binomial name
- Paramorpha aulata Meyrick, 1913

Species of moth

Paramorpha aulata is a moth in the family Carposinidae first described by Edward Meyrick in 1913. It is found in Sri Lanka.
