= Metacosmesis =

Scientific classification
- Domain: Eukaryota
- Kingdom: Animalia
- Phylum: Arthropoda
- Class: Insecta
- Order: Lepidoptera
- Family: Carposinidae
- Genus: Metacosmesis; Diakonoff, 1949

Genus of moths

Metacosmesis is a genus of moths in the Carposinidae family.

== Species ==
- Metacosmesis aelinopa Diakonoff, 1982
- Metacosmesis barbaroglypha Diakonoff, 1949
- Metacosmesis illodis Diakonoff, 1967
- Metacosmesis laxeuta Meyrick, 1906
- Metacosmesis xerostola Diakonoff, 1983 (from Saudi Arabia)
