= Anomoeosis =

Scientific classification
- Kingdom: Animalia
- Phylum: Arthropoda
- Class: Insecta
- Order: Lepidoptera
- Family: Carposinidae
- Genus: Anomoeosis; Diakonoff, 1954

Genus of moths

Anomoeosis is a genus of moths in the Carposinidae family.

== Species ==
- Anomoeosis barbara Diakonoff, 1954
- Anomoeosis carphopasta Diakonoff, 1954
- Anomoeosis conites Diakonoff, 1954
- Anomoeosis phanerostigma Diakonoff, 1954
