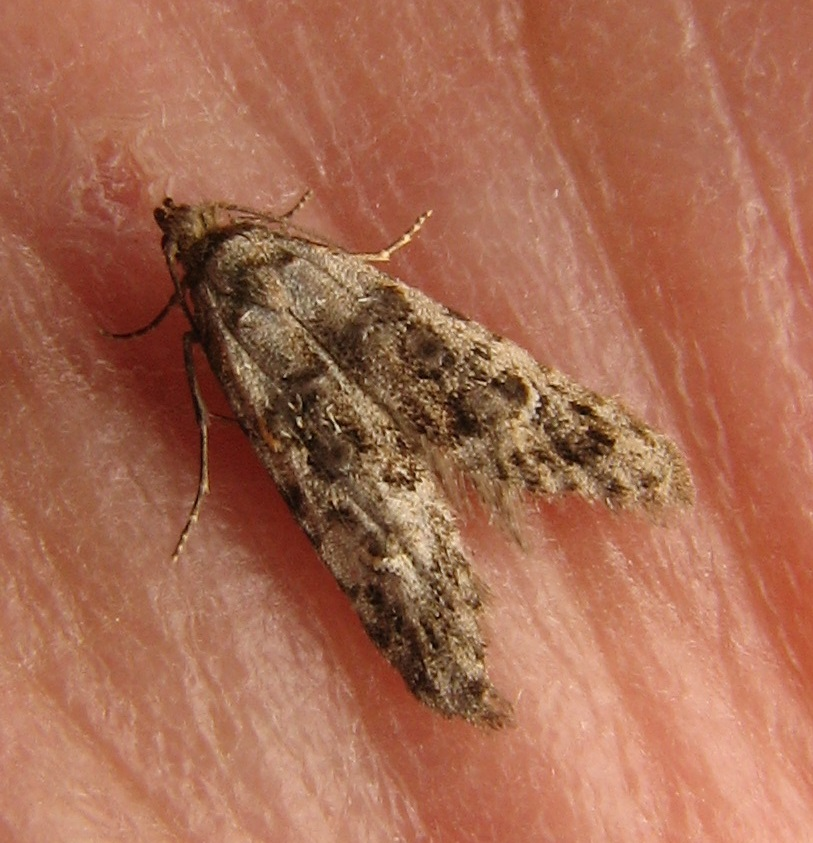
- Bondia sp.

Scientific classification
- Kingdom: Animalia
- Phylum: Arthropoda
- Clade: Pancrustacea
- Class: Insecta
- Order: Lepidoptera
- Family: Carposinidae
- Genus: Bondia; Newman, 1856

= Bondia (moth) =

Genus of moths

Bondia is a genus of moths in the Carposinidae family.

== Species ==
- Bondia attenuatana Meyrick, 1882
- Bondia caseata Meyrick, 1910
- Bondia comonana (Kearfott, 1907)
- Bondia crescentella Walsingham, 1882
- Bondia digramma Meyrick, 1910
- Bondia dissolutana Meyrick, 1882
- Bondia fidelis Meyrick, 1913
- Bondia fuscata Davis, 1969
- Bondia maleficana Meyrick, 1882
- Bondia nigella Newman, 1856
- Bondia shastana Davis, 1969
- Bondia spicata Davis, 1969
