= Actenoptila =

Scientific classification
- Domain: Eukaryota
- Kingdom: Animalia
- Phylum: Arthropoda
- Class: Insecta
- Order: Lepidoptera
- Family: Carposinidae
- Genus: Actenoptila; Diakonoff, 1954

Genus of moths

Actenoptila is a genus of moths in the Carposinidae family.

== Species ==
- Actenoptila eucosma Diakonoff, 1954
- Actenoptila eustales Diakonoff, 1954
- Actenoptila heliotropia Diakonoff, 1954
