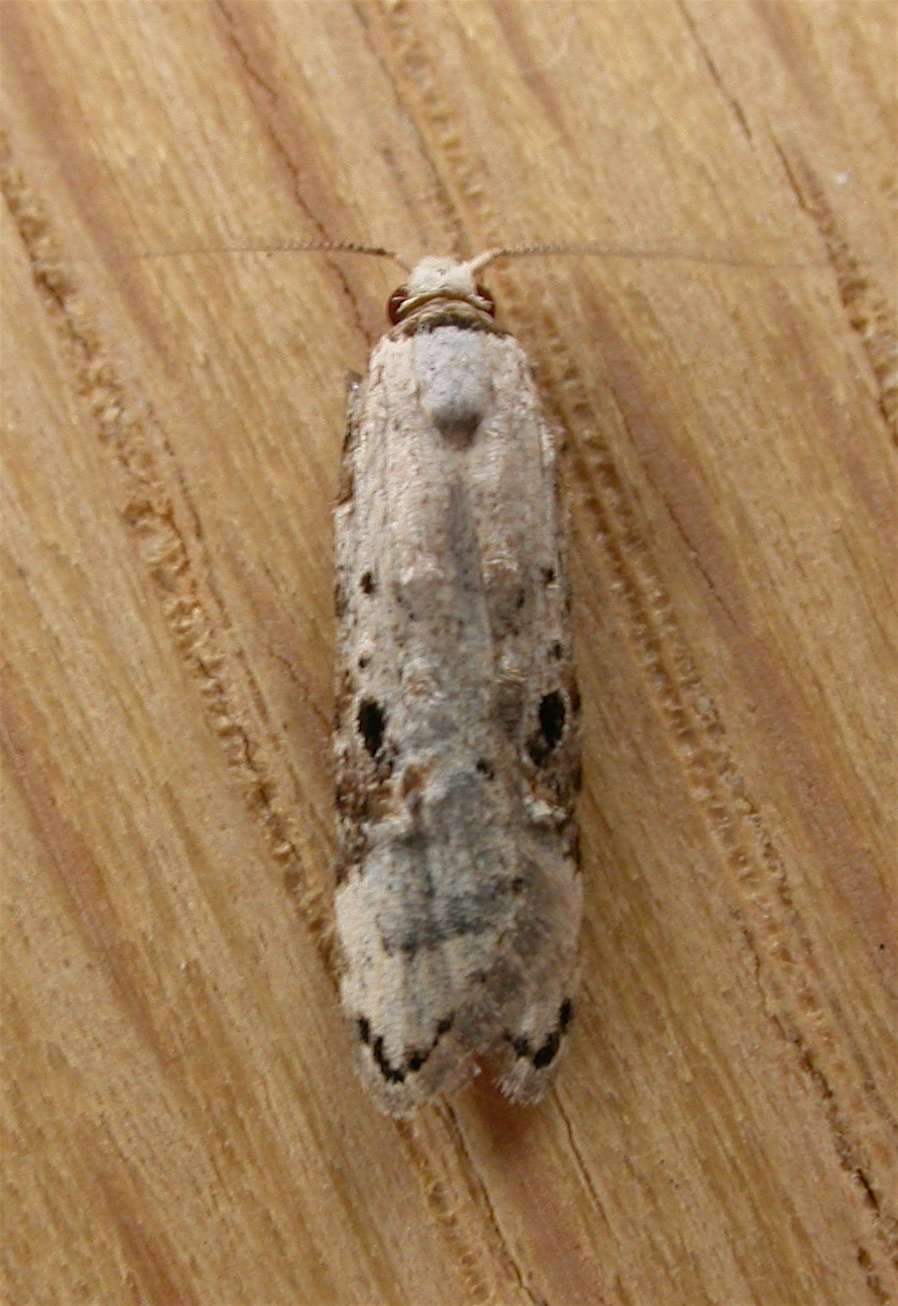

Scientific classification
- Kingdom: Animalia
- Phylum: Arthropoda
- Clade: Pancrustacea
- Class: Insecta
- Order: Lepidoptera
- Family: Carposinidae
- Genus: Sosineura; Meyrick, 1910
- Species: S. mimica

Binomial name
- Sosineura mimica (Lower, 1893)

Synonyms
- Heterocrossa mimica Lower, 1893; Carposina olbiodora Turner, 1947

= Sosineura =

Genus of moths

Sosineura mimica is a species of moth of the Carposinidae family. It is the only species in the genus Sosineura. It is found in Australia, including Tasmania.
