= Mesodica =

Scientific classification
- Domain: Eukaryota
- Kingdom: Animalia
- Phylum: Arthropoda
- Class: Insecta
- Order: Lepidoptera
- Family: Carposinidae
- Genus: Mesodica; Diakonoff, 1949

Genus of moths

Mesodica is a genus of moths in the Carposinidae family.

== Species ==
- Mesodica aggerata Meyrick, 1910
- Mesodica dryas (Diakonoff, 1950) (originally in Meridarchis)
- Mesodica infuscata Diakonoff, 1949
