= Nosphidia =

Scientific classification
- Kingdom: Animalia
- Phylum: Arthropoda
- Class: Insecta
- Order: Lepidoptera
- Family: Carposinidae
- Genus: Nosphidia; Diakonoff, 1982
- Species: N. paradoxa

Binomial name
- Nosphidia paradoxa Diakonoff, 1982

Genus of moths

Nosphidia is a monotypic moth genus in the family Carposinidae. It contains the single species Nosphidia paradoxa, which is found in Sri Lanka. Both the genus and the species were first described in 1982, by Alexey Diakonoff, a Russian–Dutch entomologist who specialised in Microlepidoptera.
