= Hystrichomorpha =

Scientific classification
- Kingdom: Animalia
- Phylum: Arthropoda
- Class: Insecta
- Order: Lepidoptera
- Family: Carposinidae
- Genus: Hystrichomorpha; Diakonoff, 1954
- Species: H. acanthina

Binomial name
- Hystrichomorpha acanthina Diakonoff, 1954

Genus of moths

Hystrichomorpha is a genus of moths in the Carposinidae family. It contains the single species Hystrichomorpha acanthina, which is found in New Guinea.
