= Archostola =

Scientific classification
- Kingdom: Animalia
- Phylum: Arthropoda
- Class: Insecta
- Order: Lepidoptera
- Family: Carposinidae
- Genus: Archostola; Diakonoff, 1949

Genus of moths

Archostola is a genus of moths in the Carposinidae family.

== Species ==
- Archostola amblystoma Diakonoff, 1989
- Archostola martyr Diakonoff, 1989
- Archostola niphauge Diakonoff, 1989
- Archostola ocytoma (Meyrick, 1938) (originally in Meridarchis)
- Archostola tianmushana Hun, 2001
- Archostola tredecim Diakonoff, 1949
