= Blipta =

Scientific classification
- Kingdom: Animalia
- Phylum: Arthropoda
- Class: Insecta
- Order: Lepidoptera
- Family: Carposinidae
- Genus: Blipta; Diakonoff, 1954

Genus of moths

Blipta is a genus of moths in the Carposinidae family.

== Species ==
- Blipta technica Diakonoff, 1954
- Blipta xylinarcha (Meyrick, 1930) (originally in Bondia)
