= Metrogenes =

Scientific classification
- Kingdom: Animalia
- Phylum: Arthropoda
- Class: Insecta
- Order: Lepidoptera
- Family: Carposinidae
- Genus: Metrogenes; Meyrick, 1926
- Species: M. deltocycla

Binomial name
- Metrogenes deltocycla Meyrick, 1926

Genus of moths

Metrogenes is a genus of moths in the Carposinidae family. It contains the single species Metrogenes deltocycla, which is found on Sarawak.
