= Epicopistis =

Scientific classification
- Kingdom: Animalia
- Phylum: Arthropoda
- Class: Insecta
- Order: Lepidoptera
- Family: Carposinidae
- Genus: Epicopistis; Turner, 1933
- Species: E. pleurospila

Binomial name
- Epicopistis pleurospila Turner, 1933

Genus of moths

Epicopistis is a genus of moths in the Carposinidae family. It contains the single species Epicopistis pleurospila, which is found in Australia, where it has been recorded from Queensland.
