= Desiarchis =

Scientific classification
- Domain: Eukaryota
- Kingdom: Animalia
- Phylum: Arthropoda
- Class: Insecta
- Order: Lepidoptera
- Family: Carposinidae
- Genus: Desiarchis; Diakonoff, 1951
- Species: D. hemisema

Binomial name
- Desiarchis hemisema Diakonoff, 1951

Genus of moths

Desiarchis is a genus of moths in the Carposinidae family. It contains the single species Desiarchis hemisema, which is found in Burma.
