= Tesuquea =

Scientific classification
- Kingdom: Animalia
- Phylum: Arthropoda
- Class: Insecta
- Order: Lepidoptera
- Family: Carposinidae
- Genus: Tesuquea; Klots, 1936
- Species: T. hawleyana

Binomial name
- Tesuquea hawleyana Klots, 1936

Genus of moths

Tesuquea is a genus of moths in the Carposinidae family. It contains the single species Tesuquea hawleyana, which is found in the southern United States, including New Mexico.

The wingspan is about 14 mm.
