= Heterogymna =

Scientific classification
- Kingdom: Animalia
- Phylum: Arthropoda
- Class: Insecta
- Order: Lepidoptera
- Family: Carposinidae
- Genus: Heterogymna; Meyrick, 1913

Genus of moths

Heterogymna is a genus of moths in the family Carposinidae.

== Species ==
- Heterogymna anterastes Diakonoff, 1954
- Heterogymna cheesmanae Bradley, 1962
- Heterogymna chorospila Meyrick, 1922
- Heterogymna collegialis Meyrick, 1925
- Heterogymna comitialis Meyrick, 1925
- Heterogymna globula Diakonoff, 1973
- Heterogymna gyritis Meyrick, 1910
- Heterogymna heptanoma Meyrick, 1925
- Heterogymna melanococca Diakonoff, 1954
- Heterogymna melanocrypta Diakonoff, 1967
- Heterogymna metarsia Diakonoff, 1989
- Heterogymna ochrogramma Meyrick, 1913
  - =Heterogymna coloba Diakonoff, 1989
  - =Heterogymna seriatopunctata Matsumura, 1931 (originally in Psecadia)
  - =Heterogymna toxotes Diakonoff, 1989
- Heterogymna pardalota Meyrick, 1922
- Heterogymna parthenia Diakonoff, 1954
- Heterogymna polystigma Diakonoff, 1954
- Heterogymna stenygra Diakonoff, 1954
- Heterogymna xenochroma Diakonoff, 1954
- Heterogymna zacentra Meyrick, 1913
