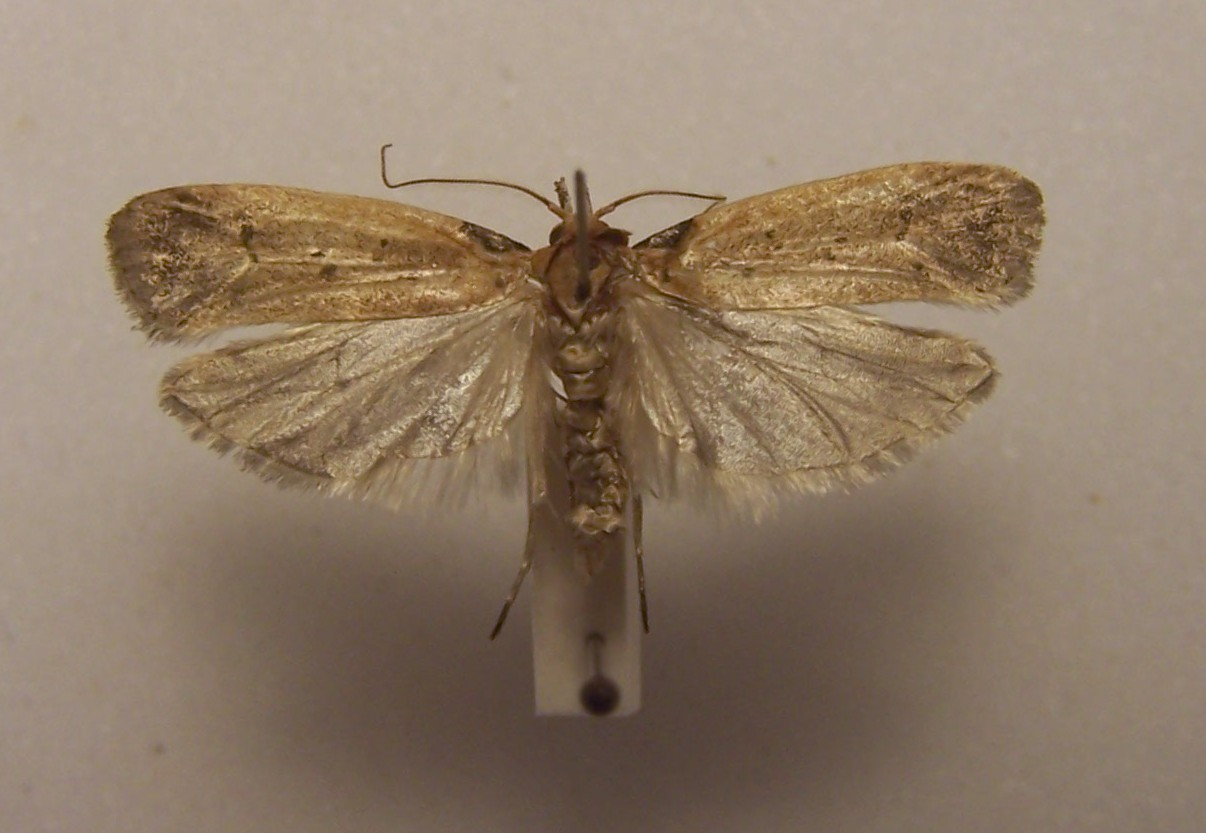

Scientific classification
- Kingdom: Animalia
- Phylum: Arthropoda
- Clade: Pancrustacea
- Class: Insecta
- Order: Lepidoptera
- Family: Carposinidae
- Genus: Glaphyrarcha; Meyrick, 1938
- Species: G. euthrepta

Binomial name
- Glaphyrarcha euthrepta Meyrick, 1938

= Glaphyrarcha =

Glaphyrarcha euthrepta

Genus of moths

Glaphyrarcha is a genus of moths of the family Carposinidae. It contains only one species Glaphyrarcha euthrepta. This species is endemic to New Zealand and has been observed in the North and South Islands in the Waikato region and at Arthur's Pass. Adults are on the wing in October and November and are attracted to light. When at rest the adults of this species hold their wings scarcely overlapping and largely flat.

== Taxonomy ==
G. euthrepta was described by Edward Meyrick in 1938 using material collected at Arthur's Pass by Mr R. Scott. George Hudson discussed and illustrated this species in his 1939 book A supplement to the butterflies and moths of New Zealand. The female holotype specimen is held at the Canterbury Museum.

== Description ==
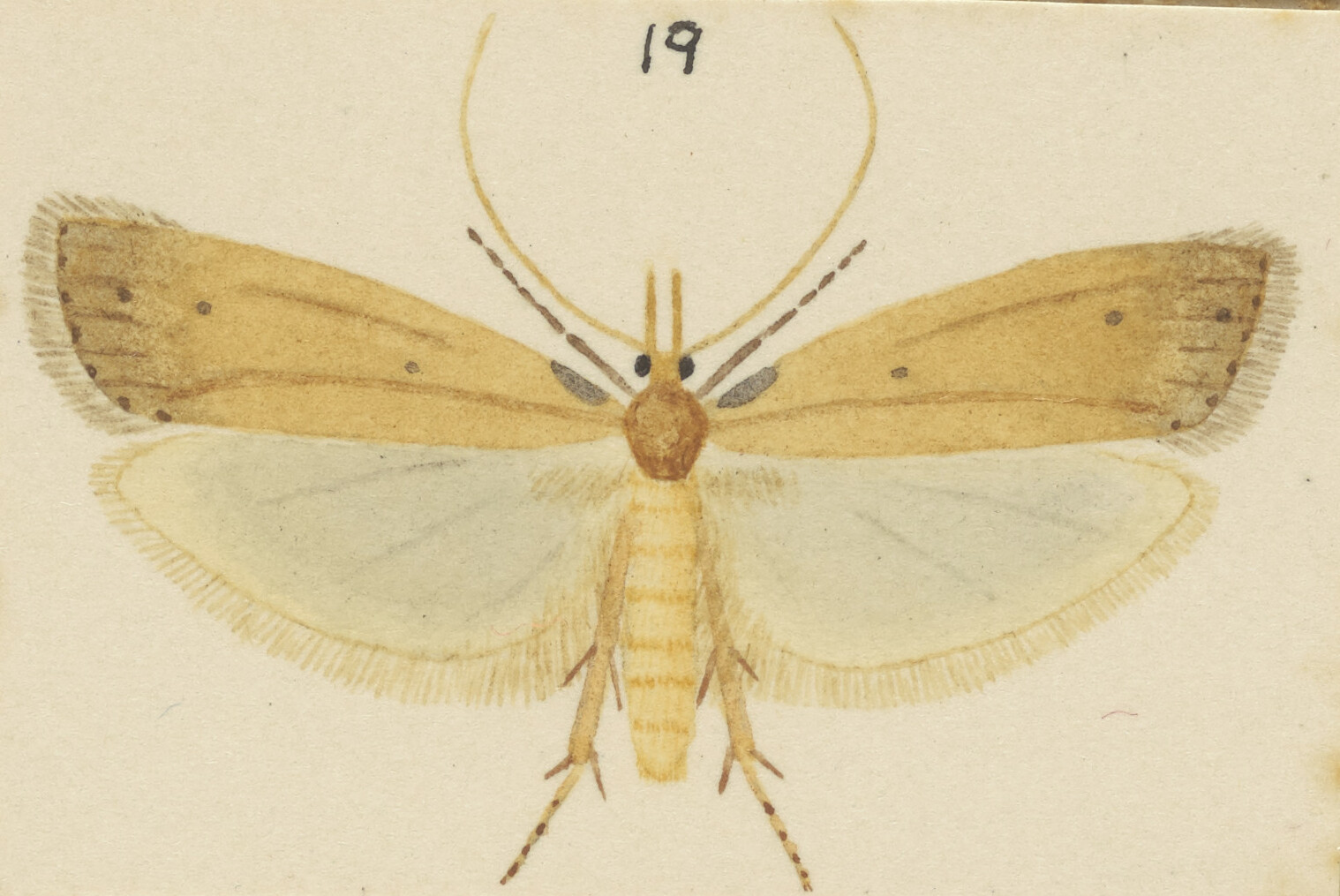
Illustration of female.

G. euthrepta has a wingspan of about 43 mm. The head, palpi and thorax are ochreous-brown and the face is pale ochreous. The forewings are very elongate-triangular, the costa moderately arched, the apex obtuse and the termen rather obliquely rounded. They are brownish-ochreous with some scattered extremely minute fuscous specks. There is a short fuscous darker-irrorated (sprinkled) streak running along the base of the costa and a small dark fuscous dot in the disc. There is also a fuscous dot at end of the cell and two or three indistinct dots of dark fuscous irroration towards the termen in the middle as well as a terminal series of indistinct dark fuscous dots or marks. The hindwings and cilia are grey-whitish.

== Distribution ==
G. euthrepta is endemic to New Zealand. It has been observed in both the North and South Islands having been collected at Arthur's Pass and at Manaia in the Waikato region.

== Biology and behaviour ==
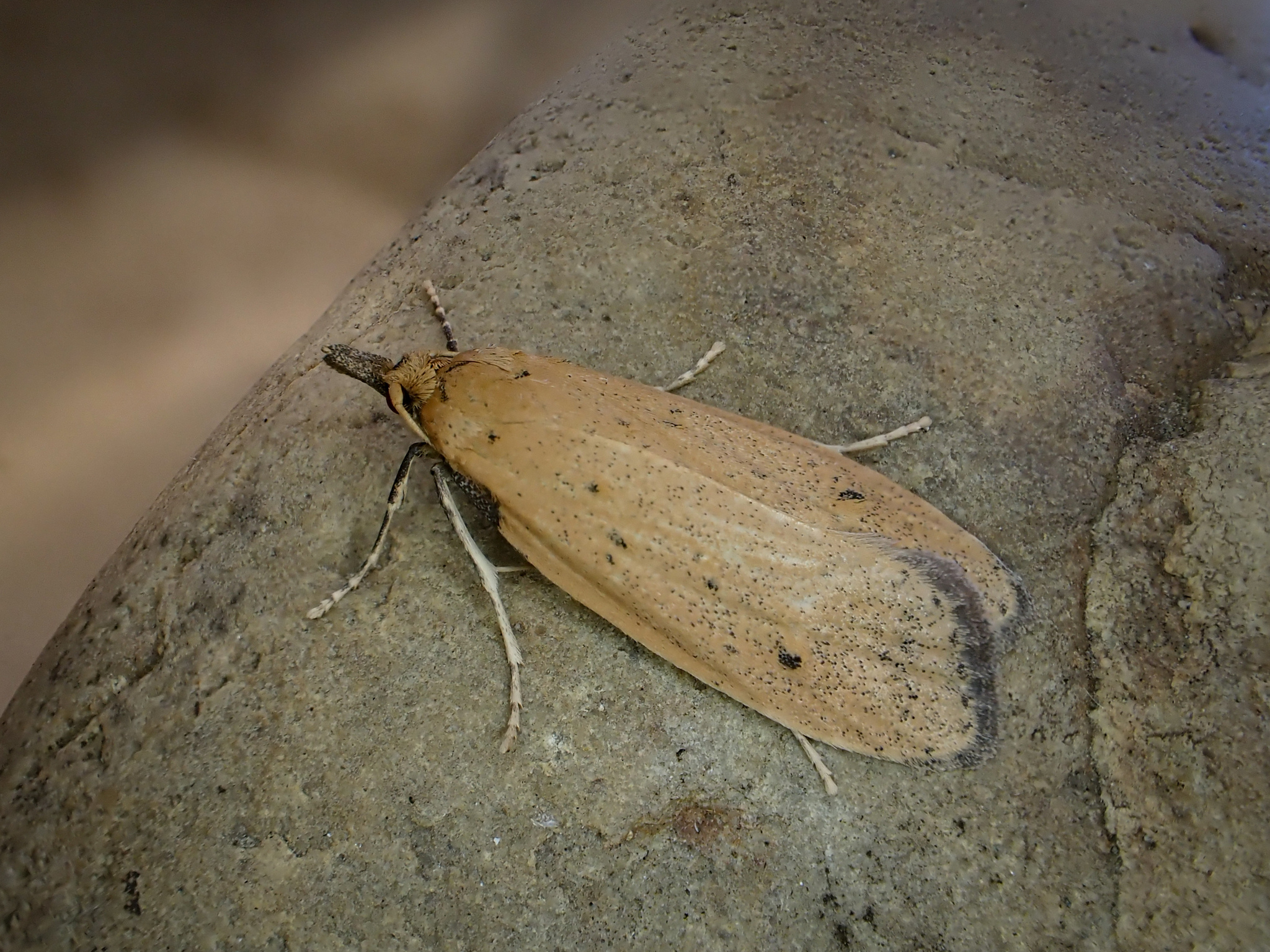
G. euthrepta resting posture.

This species is attracted to light and the holotype was originally collected by Scott after it entered his house at night. G. euthrepta is on the wing in late October and early November. G. euthrepta has a typical carposinid posture at rest with its wings scarcely overlapping and held largely flat.
