= Xyloides =

Scientific classification
- Kingdom: Animalia
- Phylum: Arthropoda
- Class: Insecta
- Order: Lepidoptera
- Family: Carposinidae
- Genus: Xyloides; Diakonoff, 1954
- Species: X. lamproxylon

Binomial name
- Xyloides lamproxylon Diakonoff, 1954

Genus of moths

Xyloides is a monotypic moth genus in the family Carposinidae described by Alexey Diakonoff in 1954. Its single species, Xyloides lamproxylon, described by the same author in the same year, is found on New Guinea.
