= Spartoneura =

Scientific classification
- Kingdom: Animalia
- Phylum: Arthropoda
- Class: Insecta
- Order: Lepidoptera
- Family: Carposinidae
- Genus: Spartoneura; Diakonoff, 1954
- Species: S. xerocrastis

Binomial name
- Spartoneura xerocrastis Diakonoff, 1954

Genus of moths

Spartoneura is a genus of moths in the Carposinidae family. It contains the single species Spartoneura xerocrastis, which is found in New Guinea.
