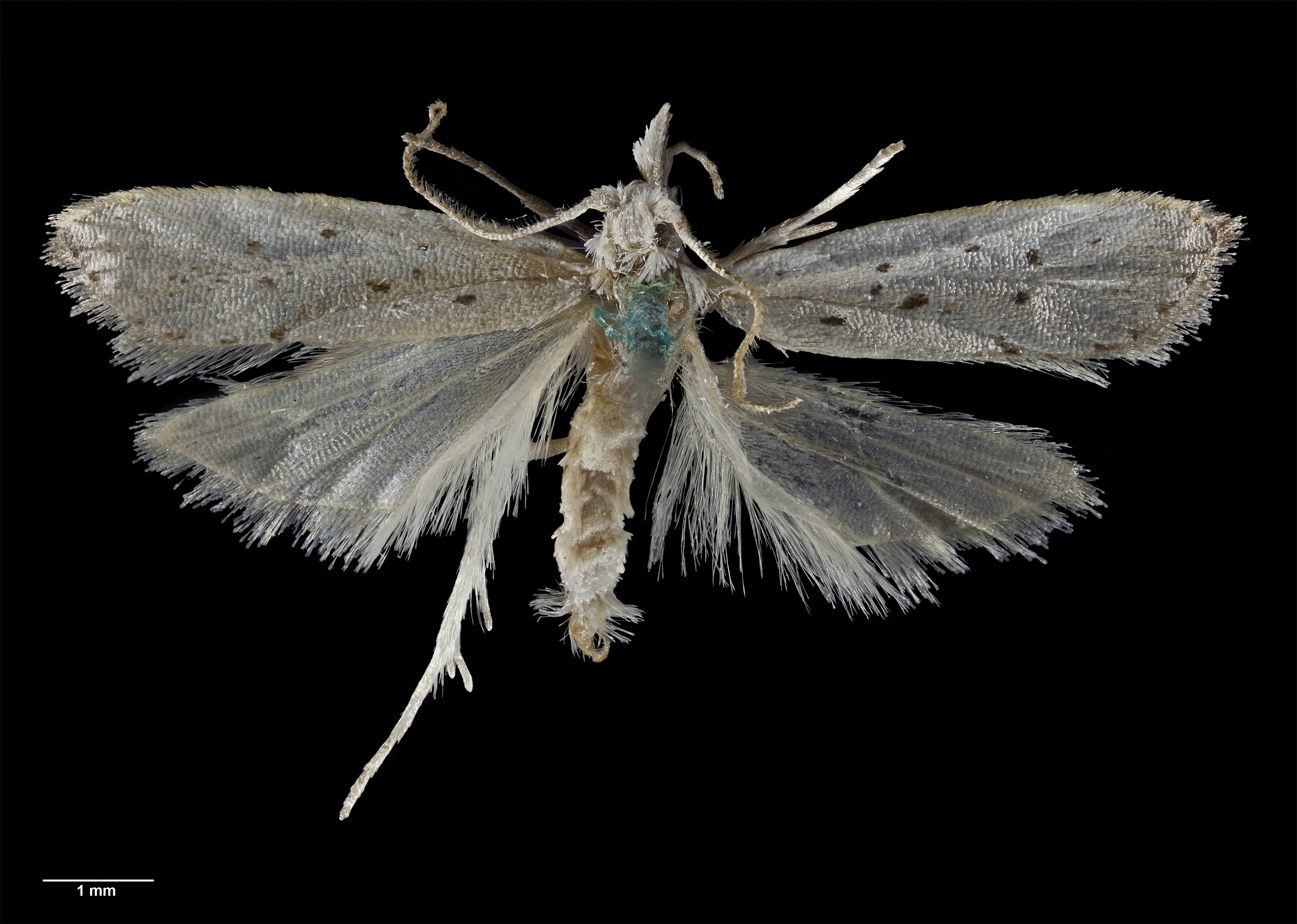
- Paramorpha marginata

Scientific classification
- Domain: Eukaryota
- Kingdom: Animalia
- Phylum: Arthropoda
- Class: Insecta
- Order: Lepidoptera
- Family: Carposinidae
- Genus: Paramorpha; Meyrick, 1881

= Paramorpha =

Genus of moths

Paramorpha is a genus of moths in the Carposinidae family. It was first described by Edward Meyrick in 1881.

== Species ==
- Paramorpha aplegia (Turner, 1916)
- Paramorpha aquilana Meyrick, 1881
- Paramorpha aulata Meyrick, 1913
- Paramorpha cylindrica Meyrick, 1922
- Paramorpha eburneola Turner, 1926
- Paramorpha glandulata Meyrick, 1922
- Paramorpha hapalopis Meyrick, 1910
- Paramorpha marginata (Philpott, 1931) (originally in Carposina)
  - =Paramorpha heptacentra Meyrick, 1931
- Paramorpha injusta Meyrick, 1913
- Paramorpha rhachias Meyrick, 1910
- Paramorpha semotheta Meyrick, 1910
- Paramorpha tenuistria Turner, 1947

== Former species ==
- Paramorpha perileuca Lower, 1908
