= Atoposea =

Scientific classification
- Kingdom: Animalia
- Phylum: Arthropoda
- Class: Insecta
- Order: Lepidoptera
- Family: Carposinidae
- Genus: Atoposea; Davis, 1969
- Species: A. maxima

Binomial name
- Atoposea maxima (Meyrick, 1912)

Synonyms
- Carposina maxima Meyrick, 1911

Genus of moths

Atoposea is a genus of moths in the Carposinidae family. It contains the single species Atoposea maxima, which is found in Colombia.
