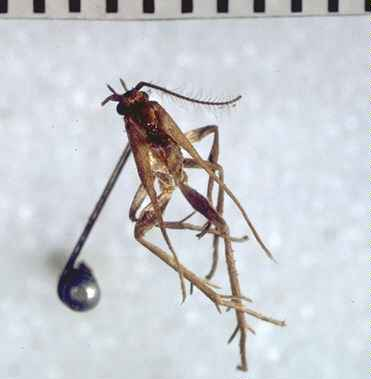
- Male holotype

Scientific classification
- Kingdom: Animalia
- Phylum: Arthropoda
- Class: Insecta
- Order: Lepidoptera
- Family: Carposinidae
- Genus: Campbellana; Salmon & Bradley, 1956
- Species: C. attenuata

Binomial name
- Campbellana attenuata Salmon and Bradley, 1956

= Campbellana =

Genus of moths

Campbellana is a genus of moths of the Carposinidae family, containing only one species, Campbellana attenuata. This species is endemic to the Campbell Islands of New Zealand.

== Taxonomy ==
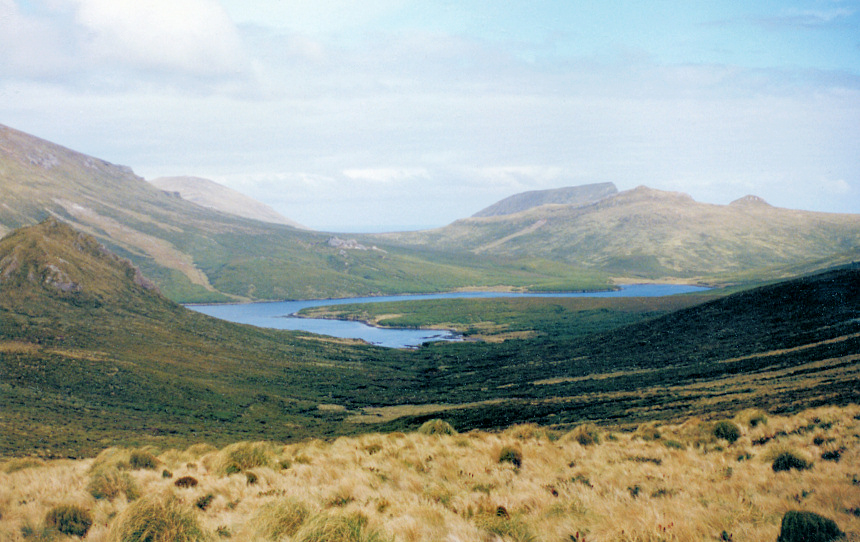
Campbell Island landscape

Campbellana and its only species C. attenuata were first described by J. T. Salmon and J. D. Bradley in 1956 using material collected by J. H. Sorensen at Campbell Island in August. Campbellana was originally placed in Yponomeutidae but was transferred to Carposinidae in 1971 by John S. Dugdale. The holotype of C. attenuata is held at the Museum of New Zealand Te Papa Tongarewa.

== Description ==
C. attenuata is described by Salmon and Bradley as follows:

Expanse of the fore wings, 13 mm. Head, thorax, and fore wing medium to dark brown in the female, paler and with scattered pale ochreous scales and crest of ochreous on top of the head in the male; antennae of female filiform, pale ochreous to creamy white, that of the male dark brown with the flagellum clothed by open whorls of extremely long fine hairs. Labial palpus pale fawn darkening to brown on terminal segment. The ventral surface and legs are paler in both sexes. Fore wings much reduced and tapering from base to apex as a long attenuated filament. Hind wings vestigial. Cilia absent from both fore and hind wings.

Both the female and male adults of C. attenuata are brachypterous, that is having much reduced wings.

== Distribution ==
This species is endemic to New Zealand. It is only found at Campbell Island.

== Habitat ==
C. attenuata inhabits tussock or sedge grassland.

== Larval hosts ==
Dugdale hypothesised that the larvae of C. attenuata feed on grasses, likely on the dicotyledonous stolons or rosettes.

== Behaviour ==
The adults of C. attenuata emerge during the colder time of the year. Specimens have been collected in August and in February. This species jumps similar to a grasshopper.
