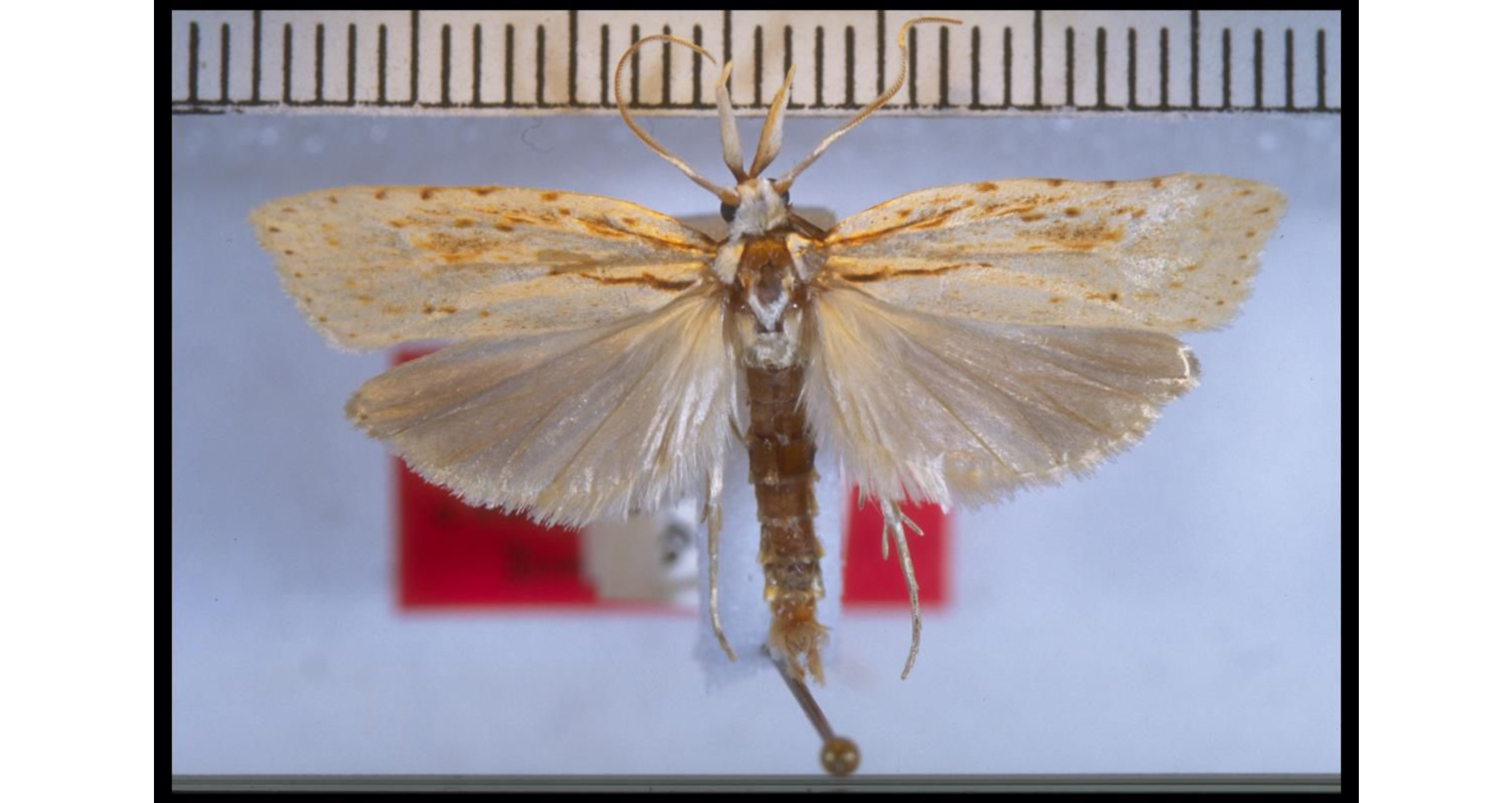
- Male holotype

Conservation status
- Naturally Uncommon (NZ TCS)

Scientific classification
- Domain: Eukaryota
- Kingdom: Animalia
- Phylum: Arthropoda
- Class: Insecta
- Order: Lepidoptera
- Family: Carposinidae
- Genus: Ctenarchis; Dugdale, 1995
- Species: C. cramboides

Binomial name
- Ctenarchis cramboides Dugdale, 1995

= Ctenarchis =

Genus of moths

Ctenarchis is a genus of moths of the family Carposinidae, containing only one species, Ctenarchis cramboides. This species is endemic to New Zealand and is found in the North Island. It has been observed in the Northland, Auckland, as well as in the Tararua regions. Adults have been observed or collected from December to March and in June and July as well as October. As at 2017 the larval host is currently unknown. Adults are attracted to light. It is classified as "At Risk, Naturally Uncommon" by the Department of Conservation.

== Taxonomy ==
Ctenarchis cramboides was first described by John S. Dugdale in 1995 using material collected by C. J. Green and himself at Spraggs Bush in the Waitākere Ranges on 9 March 1984. The holotype specimen is held at the New Zealand Arthropod Collection.

== Etymology ==
The name Ctenarchis refers to the pectinate (comblike) antenna (kteinos is Greek for a comb and -"archis", a conventional carposinid suffix).

== Description ==
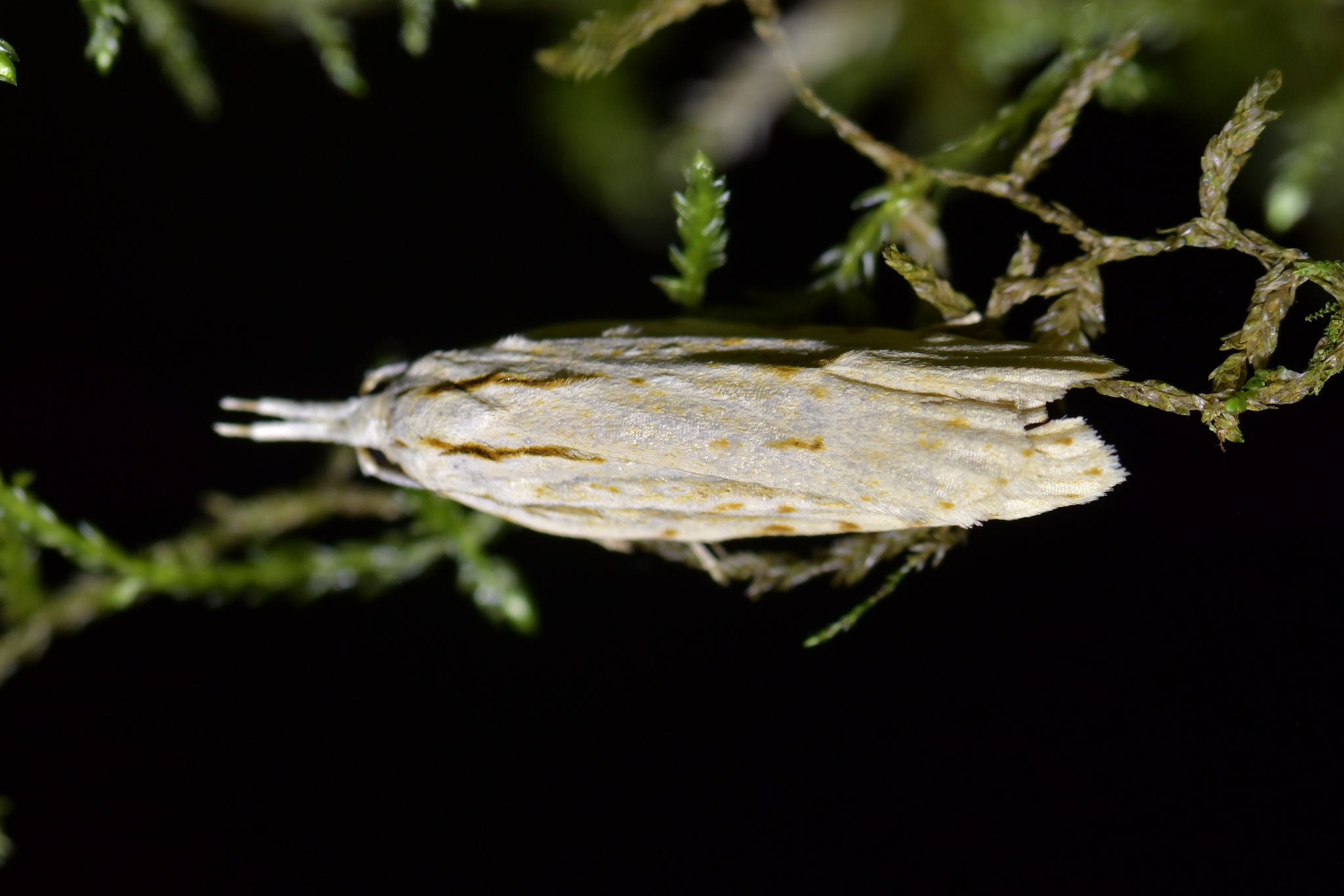
Living specimen.

The wingspan is 35–40 mm for males and about 50 mm for females.

Ctenarchis cramboides can be distinguished from other similar appearing species by its size and the length of its palpi.

== Distribution ==
This species is endemic to New Zealand and is found in the North Island. It is known from Auckland and Northland with most specimens have been collected in Titirangi. However, in 2023 this species was observed in the Tararua District extending the known range of this species.

== Biology and behaviour ==
Adult specimens have been collected from December to March and in June and July using either light or malaise traps. An adult of this species has also been observed on the wing in October. At rest, the species holds its wings mostly around the body though partly overlapping.

== Host plants and habitat ==
The host plants for the larvae of this species is unknown. This species has been collected near cabbage trees.

== Conservation status ==
Ctenarchis cramboides has been classified as having the "At Risk, Naturally Uncommon" conservation status with the qualifiers "Data Poor" and "Sparse", under the New Zealand Threat Classification System.
