= Camacostoma =

Scientific classification
- Kingdom: Animalia
- Phylum: Arthropoda
- Class: Insecta
- Order: Lepidoptera
- Family: Carposinidae
- Genus: Camacostoma; Diakonoff, 1954
- Species: C. mesosapra

Binomial name
- Camacostoma mesosapra Diakonoff, 1954

Genus of moths

Camacostoma is a genus of moths in the Carposinidae family. It contains the single species Camacostoma mesosapra, which is found in New Guinea.
