= Campylarchis =

Scientific classification
- Domain: Eukaryota
- Kingdom: Animalia
- Phylum: Arthropoda
- Class: Insecta
- Order: Lepidoptera
- Family: Carposinidae
- Genus: Campylarchis; Diakonoff, 1968
- Species: C. acuta

Binomial name
- Campylarchis acuta Diakonoff, 1967

Genus of moths

Campylarchis is a genus of moths in the Carposinidae family. It contains the single species Campylarchis acuta, which is found in Philippines (Luzon).
