= Picrorrhyncha =

Scientific classification
- Kingdom: Animalia
- Phylum: Arthropoda
- Class: Insecta
- Order: Lepidoptera
- Family: Carposinidae
- Genus: Picrorrhyncha; Meyrick, 1922

Genus of moths

Picrorrhyncha is a genus of moths in the Carposinidae family.

== Species ==
- Picrorrhyncha atribasis Diakonoff, 1950
- Picrorrhyncha pista Diakonoff, 1973
- Picrorrhyncha scaphula Meyrick, 1922
