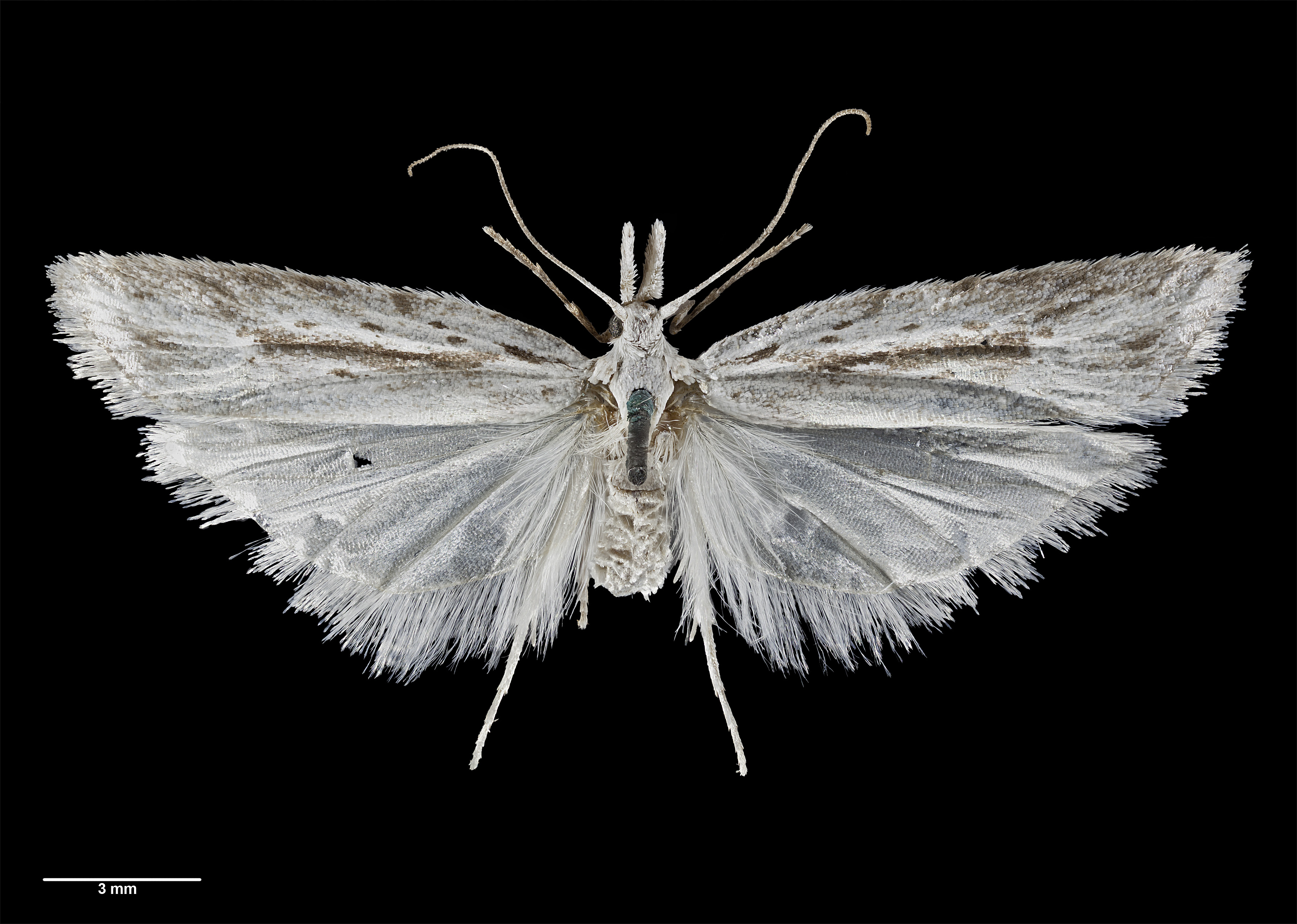

Scientific classification
- Kingdom: Animalia
- Phylum: Arthropoda
- Clade: Pancrustacea
- Class: Insecta
- Order: Lepidoptera
- Clade: Apoditrysia
- Superfamily: Carposinoidea
- Family: Carposinidae; Walsingham, 1897

Genera
- Actenoptila Diakonoff, 1954; Alexotypa Diakonoff, 1989; Anomoeosis Diakonoff, 1954; Archostola Diakonoff, 1949; Atoposea Davis, 1969; Blipta Diakonoff, 1954; Bondia Newman, 1856; Camacostoma Diakonoff, 1954; Campbellana Salmon & Bradley, 1956; Campylarchis Diakonoff, 1968; Carposina Herrich-Schäffer, 1853; =Oistophora Meyrick, 1881; =Trepsitypa Meyrick, 1913; =Dipremna Davis, 1969; =Enopa Walker, 1866; =Epipremna Davis, 1969; =Heterocrossa Meyrick, 1882; =Hypopremna Davis, 1969; Commatarcha Meyrick, 1935; =Delarchis Meyrick, 1938; Coscinoptycha Meyrick, 1881; Ctenarchis Dugdale, 1995 [nomen nudum of Meyrick]; Desiarchis Diakonoff, 1951; Epicopistis Turner, 1933; Glaphyrarcha Meyrick, 1938; Heterogymna Meyrick, 1913; Hystrichomorpha Diakonoff, 1954; Meridarchis Zeller, 1867; =Autogriphus Walsingham, 1897; =Pexinola Hampson, 1900; =Propedesis Walsingham, 1900; =Tribonica Meyrick, 1905; Mesodica Diakonoff, 1949; Metacosmesis Diakonoff, 1949; Metrogenes Meyrick, 1926; Nosphidia Diakonoff, 1982; Paramorpha Meyrick, 1881; Peragrarchis Diakonoff, 1959; Peritrichocera Diakonoff, 1961; Picrorrhyncha Meyrick, 1922; Scopalostoma Diakonoff, 1957; Sosineura Meyrick, 1910; Spartoneura Diakonoff, 1954; Tesuquea Klots, 1936; Xyloides Diakonoff, 1954

Diversity
- About 273 species

= Carposinidae =

Family of moths

Carposinidae, the "fruitworm moths", is a family of insects in the order Lepidoptera. These moths are narrower winged than Copromorphidae, with less rounded forewing tips. Males often have conspicuous patches of scales on either surface (Dugdale et al., 1999). The mouthparts are quite diagnostic, usually with prominent, upcurved "labial palps", the third segment long (especially in females), and the second segment covered in large scales. Unlike Copromorphidae, the "M2" and sometimes "M1" vein on the hindwings is absent. The relationship of Carposinidae relative to Copromorphidae needs further investigation. It is considered possible that the family is artificial, being nested within Copromorphidae (Dugdale et al., 1999). The Palearctic species have been revised by Alexey Diakonoff (1989).

== Distribution ==
Carposinidae occur worldwide except the north-western Palearctic region (Dugdale et al., 1999).

== Behaviour ==
Adults are greenish or greyish, with camouflage patterns, night flying and attracted to lights. Caterpillars live within leaves, flowers, fruits or buds, or also in galls within plant tissue. The larvae pupate with the larval shelter or descend to the ground and make a cocoon covered in detritus (Dugdale et al., 1999).

== Larval host plants ==
The caterpillars feed on the gymnosperm family Podocarpaceae as well as the dicotyledon plant families Asteraceae, Campanulaceae, Ericaceae, Fagaceae, Myrtaceae, Rosaceae, Proteaceae and Rutaceae (Dugdale et al., 1999). As the moths can infest fruit some are considered pest species such as the peach fruit moth (Center for Invasive Species and Ecosystem Health, n.d.).

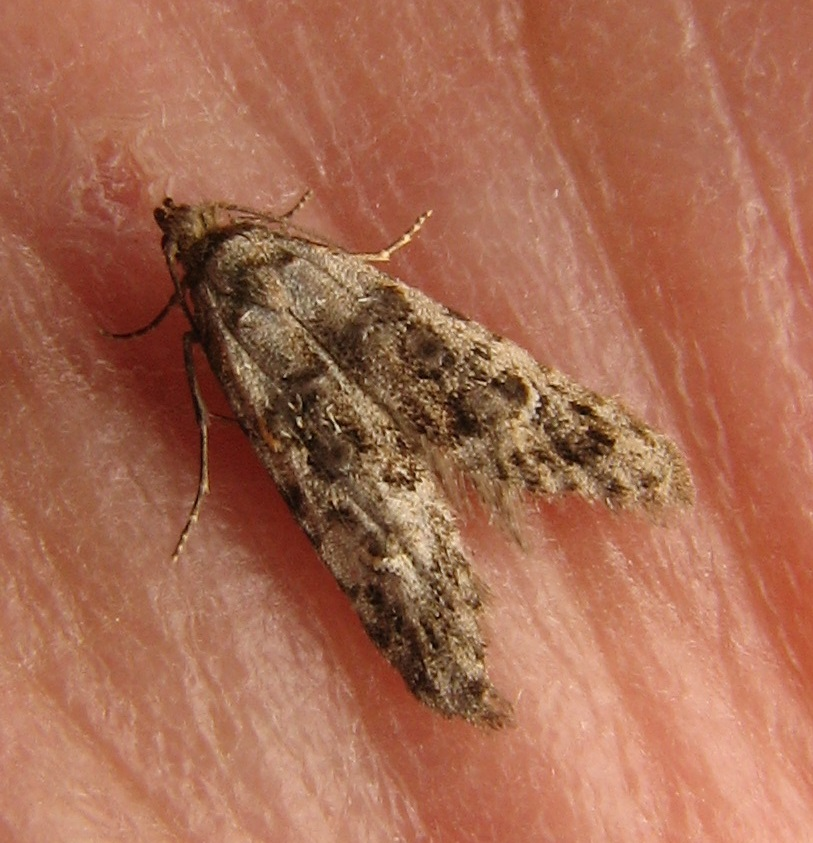
Bondia sp.
