= Pyrylium-1 =

Fluorogenic amine labelling dye

Py-1

Names
- IUPAC name (E)-2,6-dimethyl-4-(2-(2,3,6,7-tetrahydro-1H,5H-pyrido[3,2,1-ij]quinolin-9-yl)vinyl)pyrylium
- Other names P503, Chromeo 503

Identifiers
3D model (JSmol)	Interactive image
ChemSpider	26666460
- InChI: InChI=1InChI=1S/C21H24NO.BF4/c1-15-11-17(12-16(2)23-15)7-8-18-13-19-5-3-9-22-10-4-6-20(14-18)21(19)22;2-1(3,4)5/h7-8,11-14H,3-6,9-10H2,1-2H3;/q+1;-1/b8-7+; Key: JWQTUDQPRBQNPM-MIIBGCIDSA-M
- SMILES: CC1=CC(/C=C/C2=CC3=C4N(CCC3)CCCC4=C2)=CC(C)=[O+]1.F[B-](F)(F)F

Properties
Chemical formula	C_{21}H_{24}BF_{4}NO
Molar mass	393.23 g·mol^{−1}
- Except where otherwise noted, data are given for materials in their standard state (at 25 °C [77 °F], 100 kPa). Infobox references

Pyrylium-1 (Py-1) is a fluorogenic salt of a pyrylium derivative and tetrafluoroborate. It is an amine-labeling dye that is not fluorescent itself, but reacts with primary amines to form fluorescent products. It is within the "chameleon labels" class, so named due to their clear color-changing properties upon conjugation. Py-1 was first reported in 2004. It has been used for the detection of amines and peptides, largely in CE-SDS, where it is recognized to reach a high sensitivity via laser-induced fluorescence. Once bound to protein the excitation wavelength is 503 nm (green) and the emission wavelength is 603 nm (orange). Similar to FQ, these fluorescence wavelengths makes Py-1 suitable for excitation with a 488 nm argon-ion laser.

== Reaction ==
Post conjugation, the Py-1 adduct (an addition of C_{21}H_{21}N) adds about 287.1674 Da to the target molecule.

== See also ==
- 3-(2-Furoyl)quinoline-2-carboxaldehyde (FQ)
- 3-(4-Carboxybenzoyl)quinoline-2-carboxaldehyde (CBQCA)
- Fluorescamine
