= 6-Aminoquinolyl-N-hydroxysuccinimidyl carbamate =

Fluorogenic amine labelling dye

Names
- IUPAC name (2,5-dioxopyrrolidin-1-yl) N-quinolin-6-ylcarbamate
- Other names 6-AQC, AQC

Identifiers
CAS Number	148757-94-2
3D model (JSmol)	Interactive image
ChemSpider	2043270
PubChem CID	2762553
- InChI: InChI=1S/C14H11N3O4/c18-12-5-6-13(19)17(12)21-14(20)16-10-3-4-11-9(8-10)2-1-7-15-11/h1-4,7-8H,5-6H2,(H,16,20) Key: LINZYZMEBMKKIT-UHFFFAOYSA-N
- SMILES: C1CC(=O)N(C1=O)OC(=O)NC2=CC3=C(C=C2)N=CC=C3

Properties
Chemical formula	C_{14}H_{11}N_{3}O_{4}
Molar mass	285.259 g·mol^{−1}
- Except where otherwise noted, data are given for materials in their standard state (at 25 °C [77 °F], 100 kPa). Infobox references

6-Aminoquinolyl-N-hydroxysuccinimidyl carbamate (AQC) is a fluorogenic, amine labeling dye that is not fluorescent itself, but covalently reacts with secondary amines to form a fluorescently labeled product. It has a fluorescence excitation wavelength of 250 nm (UV-C), and emission wavelength of 395 nm (deep violet, near UV).

== See also ==
- Fluorescamine
- 3-(2-Furoyl)quinoline-2-carboxaldehyde (FQ)
