= 4-Fluoro-7-nitrobenzofurazan =

Fluorogenic amine labelling dye

NBD-F

Names
- Preferred IUPAC name 4-Fluoro-7-nitro-2,1,3-benzoxadiazole
- Other names NBD-F

Identifiers
CAS Number	29270-56-2
3D model (JSmol)	Interactive image
ChemSpider	108923
ECHA InfoCard	100.162.766
EC Number	634-820-0
PubChem CID	122123
UNII	L5VS78SU5J
CompTox Dashboard (EPA)	DTXSID20183521
- InChI: InChI=1S/C6H2FN3O3/c7-3-1-2-4(10(11)12)6-5(3)8-13-9-6/h1-2H Key: PGZIDERTDJHJFY-UHFFFAOYSA-N
- SMILES: C1=C(C2=NON=C2C(=C1)F)[N+](=O)[O-]

Properties
Chemical formula	C_{6}H_{2}FN_{3}O_{3}
Molar mass	183.10 g/mol
- Except where otherwise noted, data are given for materials in their standard state (at 25 °C [77 °F], 100 kPa). Infobox references

4-Fluoro-7-nitrobenzofurazan (NBD-F) is a fluorogenic, amine labeling dye that is not fluorescent itself, but covalently reacts with secondary or primary amines to form a fluorescently labeled product. It and other fluorogenic benzofurans (i.e. NBD-Cl) are used for derivitization in HPLC applications. After the fluorogenic reaction, it can be detected with an excitation wavelength of 470 nm (blue) and an emission wavelength of 530 nm (green), enabling an HPLC limit of detection of 10 fmol.

== See also ==
- Fluorescamine
- 3-(2-Furoyl)quinoline-2-carboxaldehyde (FQ)
