= Neutrophil oxidative index =

Health disease test

- Purpose: measure of neutrophil oxidation

Neutrophil oxidative burst test (or chronic granulomatous disease (CGD) test) is a measure of neutrophil oxidation and is a useful assay in the diagnosis of chronic granulomatous disease and is also a useful means to determine the overall metabolic integrity of phagocytosing neutrophils. The NADPH oxidase enzyme is missing in CGD. From total blood, neutrophils can be purified and the NADPH oxidase activity can be measured with different methods in these cells after activation. Phagocytosis by polymorphonuclear neutrophils and monocytes constitutes an essential arm of host defense against bacterial or fungal infections. The phagocytic process can be separated into several major stages: chemotaxis (migration of phagocytes to inflammatory sites), attachment of particles to the cell surface of phagocytes, ingestion (phagocytosis) and intracellular killing by oxygen-dependent (oxidative burst) and oxygen-independent mechanisms.

Sample results are expressed as a normal oxidative index (NOI), which is the ratio of the fluorescence in stimulated cells to the fluorescence expressed in unstimulated cells. The normal range is > 73 NOI.

== Method ==
In the neutrophil oxidative burst test heparinized whole blood is incubated at 37 °C with phorbol myristate acetate (PMA), a compound known to stimulate oxidative burst activity. Each flow cytometry pattern is referenced to the patients non-stimulated cells. In addition, a control blood is included in each run.

Upon stimulation, granulocytes and monocytes produce reactive oxygen metabolites (superoxide anion, hydrogen peroxide, hypochlorous acid) which destroy bacteria inside the phagosome.

Formation of the reactive oxidants during the oxidative burst can be monitored by the addition and enzymatic oxidation of a fluorogenic substrate, DHR 123. The level of reactive oxygen radicals is determined by flow cytometry.

== Specimen requirements ==
Usually a minimum of 5mL whole blood collected in a sodium heparinized tube is required for the test.
