= C23H22O7 =

The molecular formula C_{23}H_{22}O_{7} (molar mass: 410.41 g/mol, exact mass: 410.1366 u) may refer to:

- Epicocconone, a fluorescent dye
- Lactucopicrin, a bitter substance that has a sedative and analgesic effect
- Tephrosin, a natural fish poison
