= C9H8O5 =

The molecular formula C_{9}H_{8}O_{5} (molar mass: 196.16 g/mol, exact mass: 196.037173 u) may refer to:

- 2,4,5-Trihydroxycinnamic acid
- Flavipin
