= E. nigrum =

E. nigrum may refer to:

- Empetrum nigrum, the black crowberry, a plant species native to most northern areas of the northern hemisphere
- Epicoccum nigrum, a fungal plant pathogen species
- Etheostoma nigrum, the Johnny darter, a fish species
