= Ziziphus mauritiana =

Conservation status
- Least Concern (IUCN 3.1)

Scientific classification
- Kingdom: Plantae
- Clade: Tracheophytes
- Clade: Angiosperms
- Clade: Eudicots
- Clade: Rosids
- Order: Rosales
- Family: Rhamnaceae
- Genus: Ziziphus
- Species: Z. mauritiana

Binomial name
- Ziziphus mauritiana Lam.

Varieties
- Ziziphus mauritiana var. fruticosa (Haines) Sebastine & A.N.Henry; Ziziphus mauritiana var. mauritiana; Ziziphus mauritiana var. pedunculata Bhandari & Bhansali; Ziziphus mauritiana var. pubescens Bhandari & Bhansali; Ziziphus mauritiana var. spontanea (Edgew.) R.R.Stewart ex Qaiser & Nazim.

Synonyms
- Sarcomphalus mauritianus (Lam.) Raf.; Ziziphus indica Chaz., nom. illeg. superfl.

Species of plant

Ziziphus mauritiana, also known as Indian jujube, Indian plum, Chinese apple, ber (Hindi: बेर) and dunks, is a tropical, spiny, evergreen shrub or small tree in the buckthorn family Rhamnaceae. It is often confused with the closely related Chinese jujube (Z. jujuba): Z. mauritiana is common in tropical and subtropical climates, while Z. jujuba prefers temperate climates.

The plant grows vigorously up to 12 metres (39 ft) high, with a trunk 30 centimetres (12 in) or more in diameter. It has a spreading crown with stipular spines and drooping branches. The fruit is oval, obovate, oblong or round, and can be 2.5–6 centimetres (0.98–2.36 in) long depending on the variety, having smooth, light green skin when unripe, turning yellow and then reddish brown as it ripens.

== Origin and distribution ==
The species is believed to be native to South Asia, southern China, Southeast Asia, and Central and West Africa. It has been introduced to the tropical regions of the Americas, and is now widely naturalised throughout the Old World tropics from Southern Africa through the Middle East to South Asia and China, into Australasia and the Pacific Islands. While the Rhamnaceae family contains many nitrogen-fixing species, Z. mauritiana can form dense stands and become invasive in some areas, including Fiji and Australia, where it has become a serious environmental weed.

The species name mauritiana likely references the island of Mauritius, despite the species not being native there, due to trade routes or the movement of plant specimens through the region during the 18th century when Mauritius was an important colonial hub. In taxonomy, newly described species were historically often associated with the nearest or most significant landmasses known at the time of discovery, rather than the exact location where the species was found.

== Morphology ==
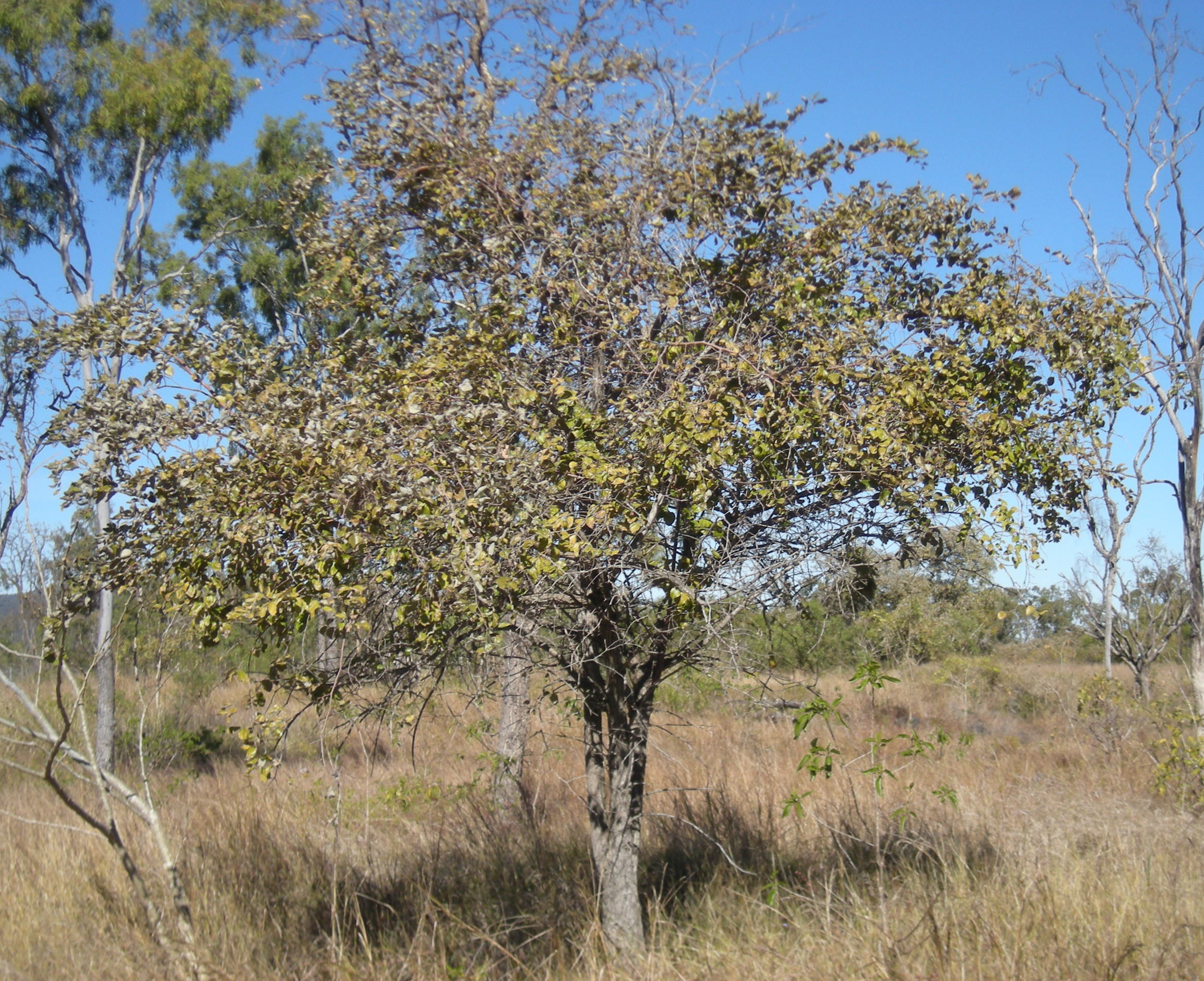
Tree in Queensland, Australia

Indian jujube (Ber) - Fresh Fruit
Nutritional value per 100 g (3.5 oz)
- Energy: 244.76 kJ (58.50 kcal)
- Carbohydrates: 17 g
- Sugars: 5.4-10.5 g
- Dietary fibre: 0.60 g
- Fat: 0.07 g
- Protein: 0.8 g
Vitamins and minerals
Vitamins	Quantity %DV^{†}
Thiamine (B1)	2% 0.022 mg
Riboflavin (B2)	2% 0.029 mg
Niacin (B3)	5% 0.79 mg
Vitamin C	79% 70.9 mg
Minerals	Quantity %DV^{†}
Calcium	2% 25.6 mg
Iron	6% 1.1 mg
Phosphorus	2% 26.8 mg
- Other constituents: Quantity
- Water: 81.6-83.0 g
- ^{†}Percentages estimated using US recommendations for adults.

Ziziphus mauritiana has a rapidly developing taproot, a necessary adaptation to drought conditions. The species varies widely in height, from a bushy shrub 1.5–2 metres (4.9–6.6 ft) tall, to a tree 10–12 metres (33–39 ft) tall with a trunk diameter of about 30 centimetres (12 in). Z. mauritiana may be erect or wide-spreading, with gracefully drooping thorny branches and zigzag branchlets, with short, sharp straight or hooked thorns; some varieties are thornless.

The leaves are alternate and ovate or oblong-elliptic in shape with rounded apices, with three main longitudinal veins originating from the petiole. The size of the leaves ranges from 2.5–6.3 centimetres (0.98–2.48 in) long and 2–4 centimetres (0.79–1.57 in) wide. The upperside (adaxial surface) of the leaves is dark-green and smooth, while the underside (abaxial surface) is covered with hairs.

The flowers are tiny and yellow with five petals, located on leaf axils. They open fully in the early morning or later in the day, depending on the cultivar. Fertilisation relies on cross-pollination by insects attracted by the odour and nectar. Pollination is done by honeybees, wasps (Polistes sp.) and houseflies. Due to the protandrous nature of the flowers, the trees cannot reliably self-pollinate. The unpleasant scent of the flowers is caused by skatole, a volatile organic compound released at high concentrations at anthesis.

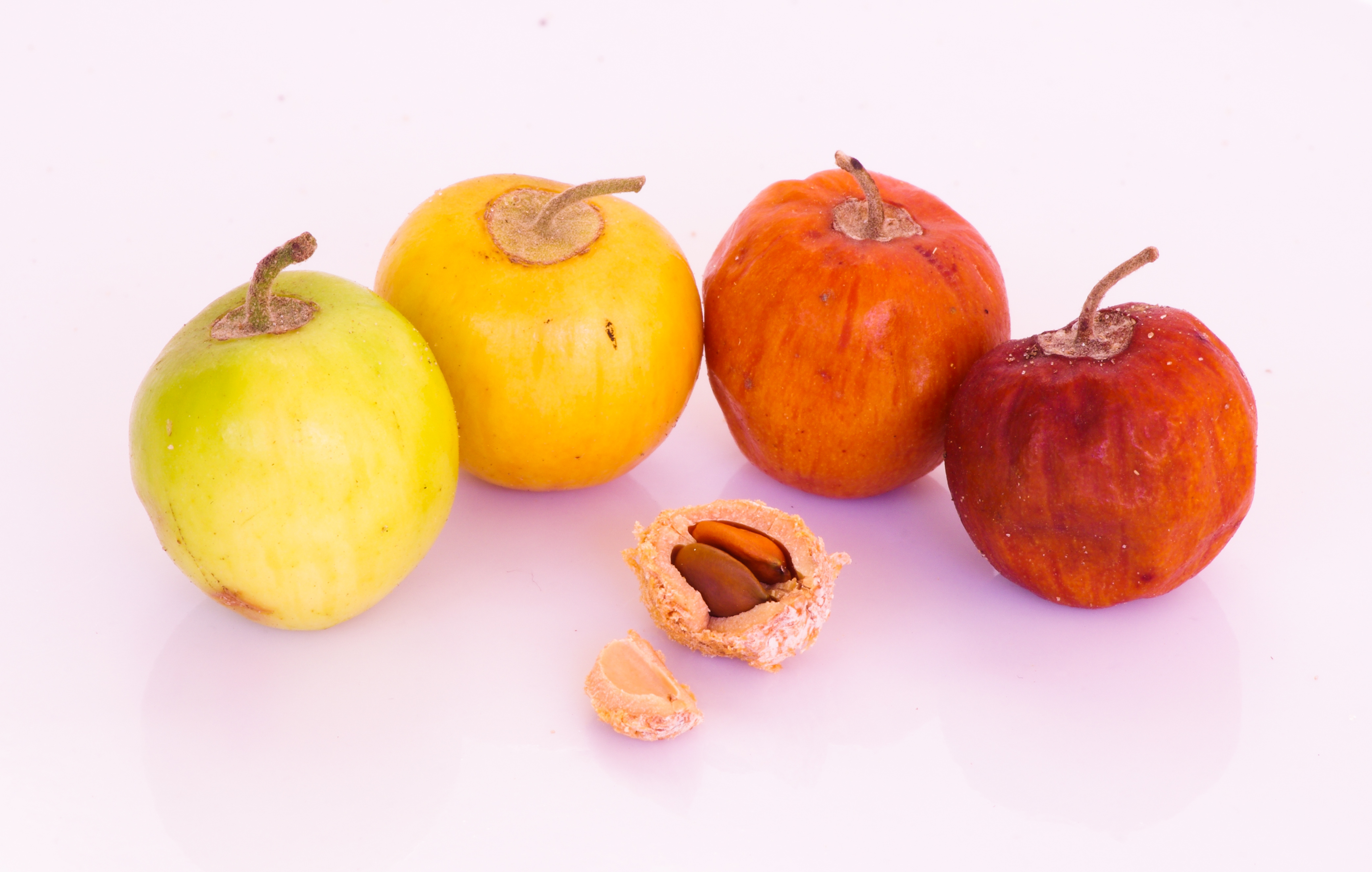
Fruits at various stages of ripeness, with cracked pit showing the two seeds

This fast-growing tree bears fruit within three years. The fruit is an oval, obovate, round or oblong drupe that measures 2.5 centimetres (0.98 in) diameter, though in some cultivars it can measure up to 6 centimetres (2.4 in) long and 4 centimetres (1.6 in) wide. When unripe, the skin is light green in colour while the flesh is white and crispy, with a bland, sour or slightly sweet flavour. The ripe fruit has a pleasant aroma and a soft, juicy and somewhat mealy texture, with wrinkled skin and a sweet-sour taste. Overripe fruits are more wrinkled, and the flesh becomes soft, spongy and buff-coloured with a musky scent. Each fruit contains an oval or oblate rough pit, containing one or two ellipsoid red-brown kernels, each measuring 6 millimetres (0.24 in) long.

== Ecology ==
Tree in Punto Fijo, Venezuela.

This hardy tree can withstand extreme temperatures and thrives in rather dry or water-logged conditions with an annual rainfall of 125–2,225 millimetres (4.9–87.6 in). In Fiji, naturalised trees grow along roadsides and on agricultural land, usually near sea level but occasionally up to an elevation of 600 metres (2,000 ft). It also grows well on laterite soils with good drainage, or sandy, gravelly, alluvial soil of dry riverbeds. In Australia, this species grows on a wide variety of soil types, including cracking clays, solodic soils and deep alluvials, in tropical and subtropical areas with an average annual rainfall of 470–1,200 millimetres (19–47 in). In the drier parts of this range, it grows best in riparian zones. Commercial cultivation usually extends up to 1,000 metres (3,300 ft). Above this elevation, the trees do not grow well, and cultivation becomes less economical.

While this species can withstand extreme conditions, it is more widespread in areas with an annual rainfall of 300–500 millimetres (12–20 in). In China and India, it grows wild up to an elevation of 1,650 metres (5,410 ft). The minimum temperature for survival is 7 °C (45 °F) and the maximum is 50 °C (122 °F). Studies report that this species flourishes in alkaline soils with a pH as high as 9.2. However, deep sandy loam to loamy soils with neutral or slightly alkaline pH are considered optimum for growth.

== Propagation ==
Propagation is best done by seed, grafting or cuttings. The seeds are spread by birds, livestock, feral pigs, humans and other mammals. Seeds may remain viable for over two years, but the germination rate decreases with age. Cross-incompatibility occurs, and cultivars have to be matched for good fruit set; some cultivars produce good crops parthenocarpically.

In India, there are 90 or more cultivars varying in growth habit, leaf shape, fruiting season, and fruit form, size, colour, flavour and storage quality. Among the important cultivars, 11 are described in the encyclopaedic Wealth of India: Banarasi (or Banarsi) Pewandi, Dandan, Kaithli (Patham), Muria Mahrara, Narikelee, Nazuk, Sanauri 1, Sanauri 5, Thornless and Umran (Umri). Most of the cultivars have smooth and greenish-yellow to yellow skin.

Seeds still in their pits need to be stored for 21–28 days to allow after-ripening before planting. To stimulate faster germination, pits are placed in a 17–18% salt solution and all that float are discarded. The pits that sink are dipped in 500 ppm thiourea for four hours and then cracked, and the separated seeds can germinate in seven days.

Seedlings respond poorly to transplanting, so the seeds are best sown directly in the ground. Seedlings grown from wild seeds can be converted into improved cultivars by top-working and grafting. Nurseries are used for large-scale seedling and graft production. The seedlings grow best in full sunlight, and need to grow for as long as 15 months in the nursery before planting in the field.

Scientists in India have standardised propagation techniques for plant establishment. Budding is the easiest method to vegetatively propagate improved cultivars. with ring-budding and shield-budding being the most successful methods. Wild species are usually used as rootstock, the most common being Z. rotundifolia in India and Z. spina-christi in Africa.

== Cultivation and uses ==
Ziziphus mauritiana is widely grown in both its native and introduced ranges, mainly for its fruit. The main producing regions of Z. mauritiana fruit are the arid and semi arid areas of India. The crop is also grown in Pakistan, Bangladesh, Vietnam, the Caribbean and parts of Africa. From 1984 to 1995, with improved cultivars, 0.9 million tonnes of fruit were produced on a land area of 88,000 hectares (220,000 acres). A tree in northern India can yield 80–200 kilograms (180–440 lb) of fresh fruit per year in its prime bearing age of 10–20 years.

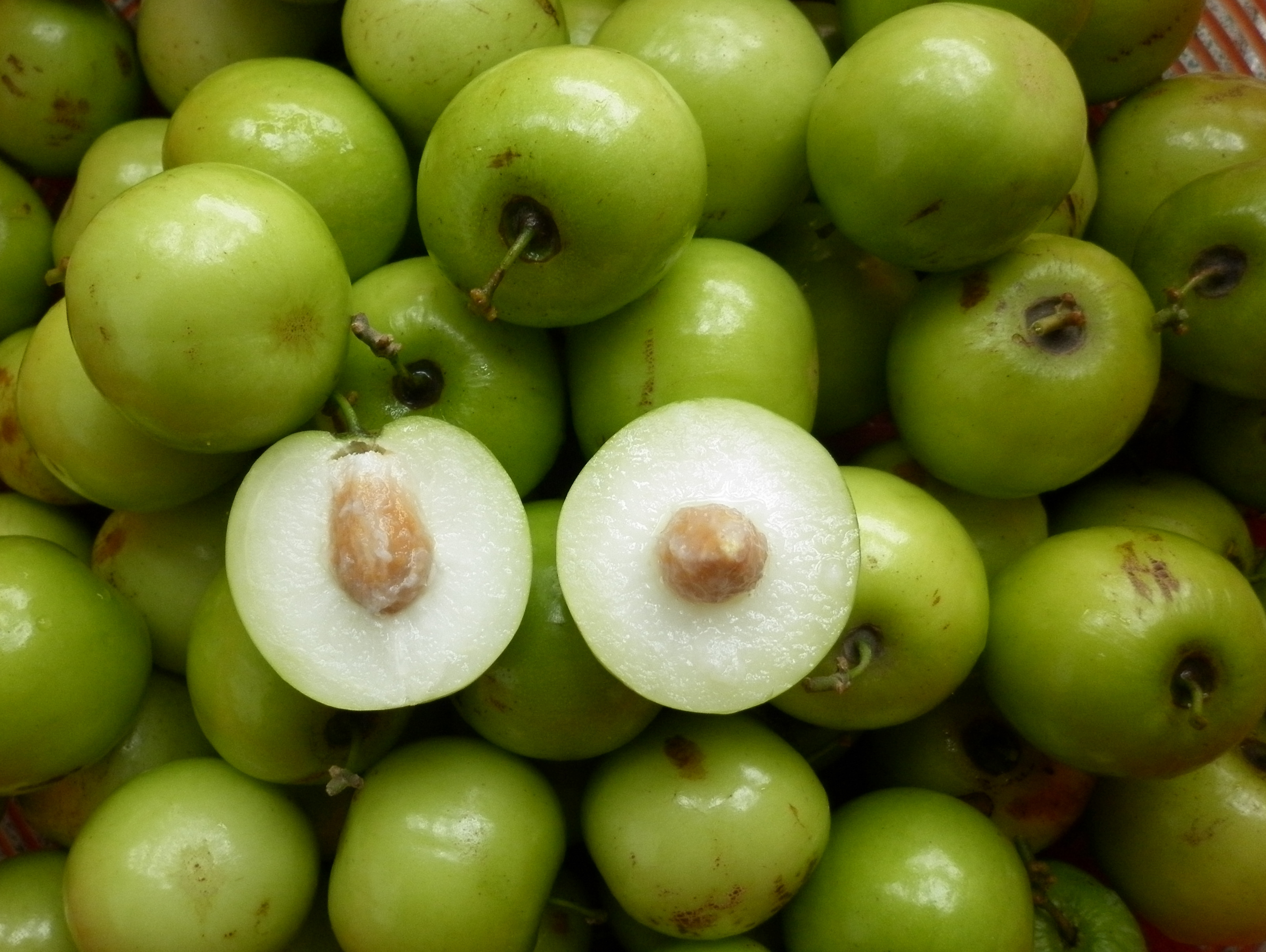
Unripe fruit in Vietnam, cut to show the pit in the middle

The fruit is eaten raw, used in beverages or made into preserves. It is rich in vitamin C, second only to guava, and much higher than citrus fruits and apples. The unripe fruit is eaten much like an apple, sometimes with a little salt. In India, the ripe fruits are consumed raw or cooked, while slightly underripe fruits are candied. Ripe fruits can be made into a drink, or preserved by sun-drying and ground into powder.

The leaves are used to make an infusion in Indonesia. In Venezuela, fruits are made into a liqueur called crema de ponsigue. Seed kernels are eaten in times of famine. The leaves are also eaten by camels, cattle and goats.

In India and Queensland, Australia, the flowers are a source of nectar for honeybees. The honey is golden amber in colour with a malty, earthy flavour.

The timber is hard, strong, fine-grained, fine-textured, durable and reddish in colour, used in a wide variety of applications including boat ribs, agricultural tools and footwear. The wood is also used as fuel in many areas. In tropical Africa, the flexible branches are wrapped as retaining bands around conical thatched roofs of huts, and are twined together to form thorny corral walls to retain livestock.

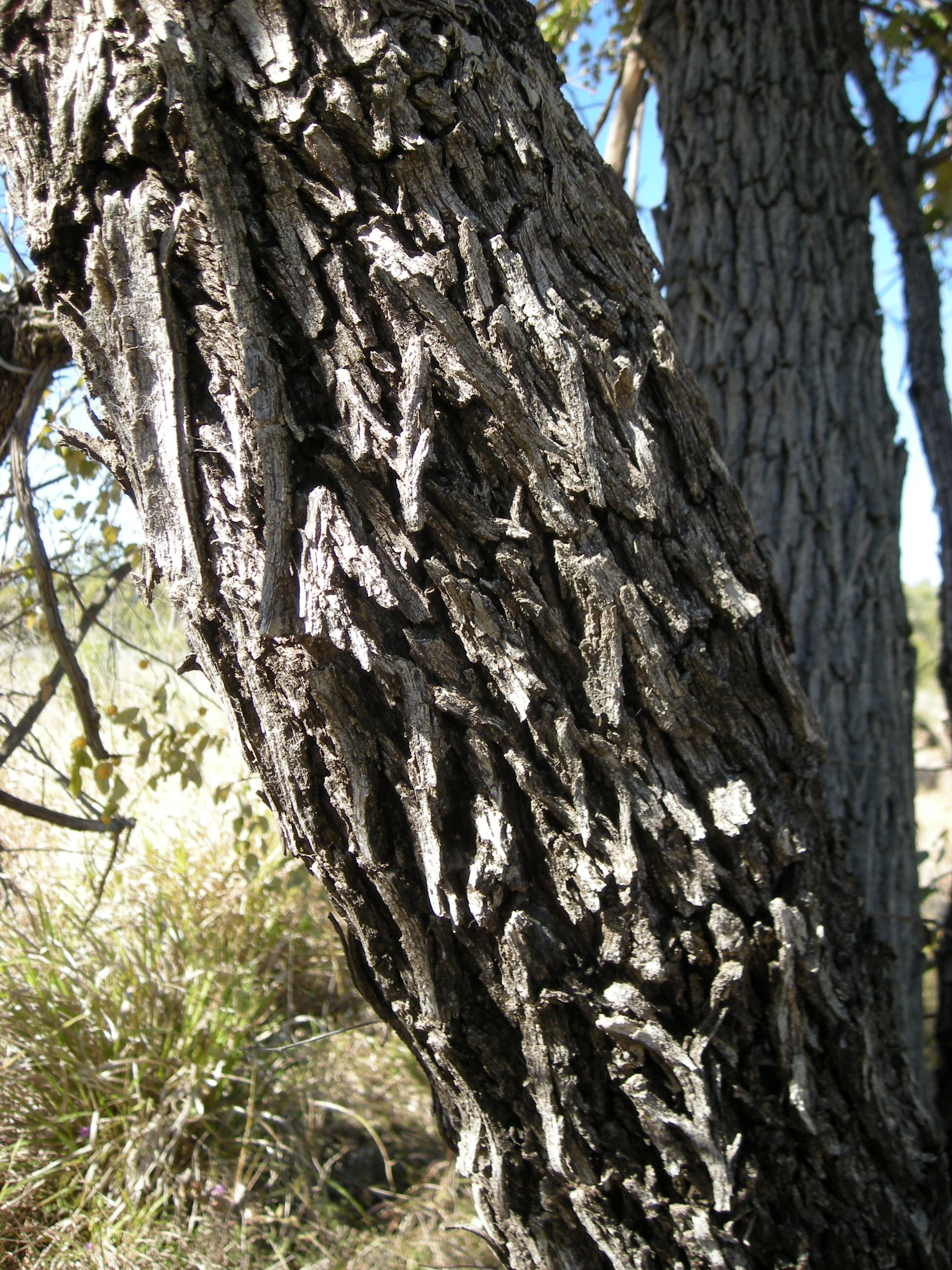
Bark

Traditional remedies using Z. mauritiana address a wide range of ailments, particularly in India where the plant is commonly known as ber. To treat rheumatism, a poultice made from leaves, roots and Senna auriculata roots is applied to the affected area. Chronic coughs are treated with bark paste fried in ghee and taken with a small amount of rock salt, while vomiting is treated by consuming root-bark powder mixed with rice-washing water. Leaf juice is gently applied around the eyes for eye disorders and is also used in hair care, where a paste of ber, amla (Phyllanthus emblica) and neem (Azadirachta indica) leaves is applied to the scalp. For wounds, pimples, acne, abscesses, boils and carbuncles, a poultice of leaves is applied topically. Indigestion is treated by taking root paste orally, while dried leaf powder is traditionally used to manage diabetes. A decoction of the leaves is used as a hair wash, in addition to a diuretic to manage fluid retention, oedema, sciatica, kidney stones, lymphatic swelling, glaucoma and liver disorders. For diarrhoea, powdered dried fruit is taken with water, and for dysentery, leaf juices from patharchatta, jamun and ber are taken together.

In West Bengal, it is offered to Goddess Saraswati and people refrain from consuming the fruit before offering it to the goddess.

== Season and harvesting ==
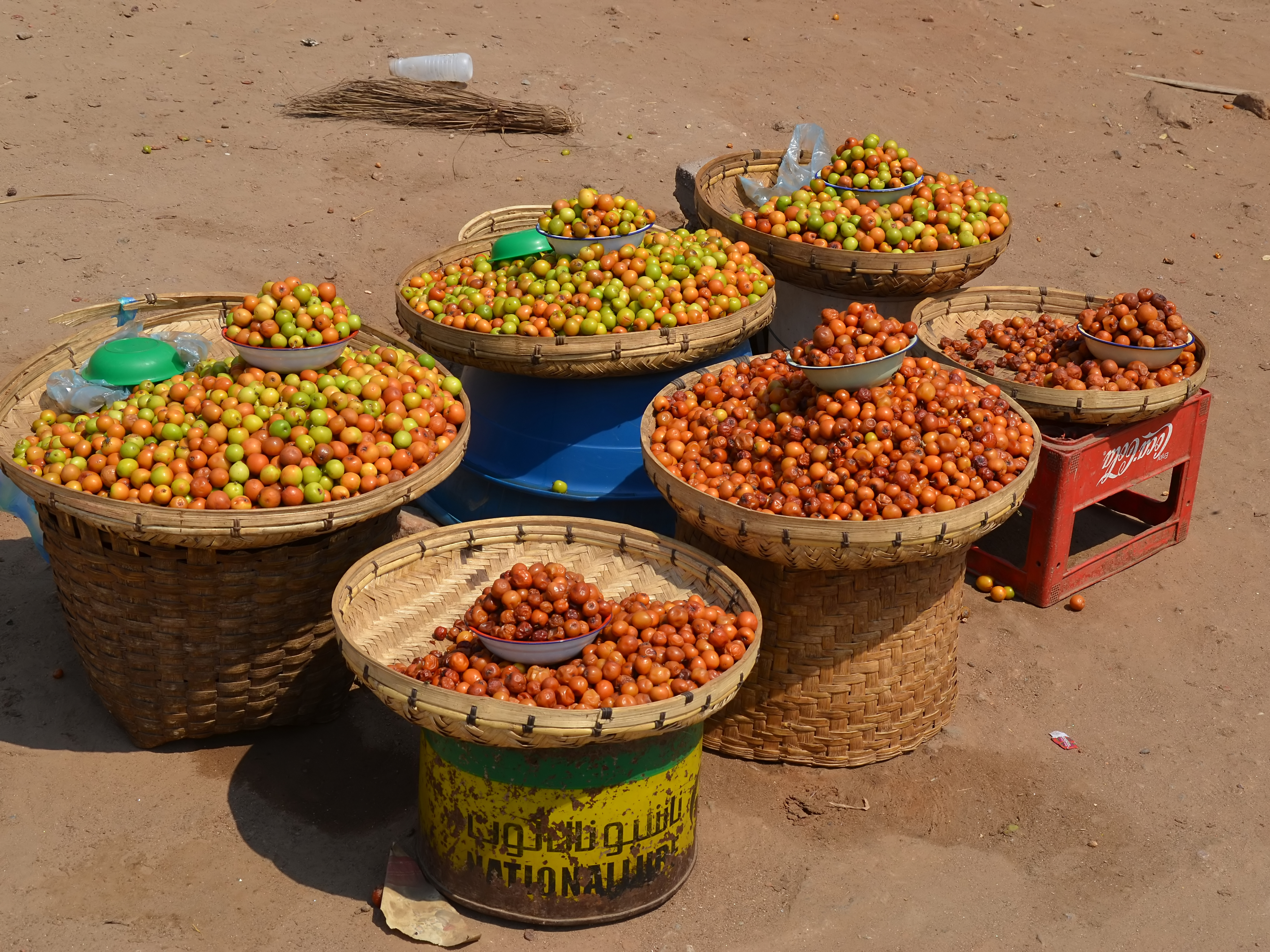
Ripe and unripe jujube fruits for sale at the Luangwa Bridge in Zambia

Plants are capable of seed production once they reach a height of about 1 metre (3.3 ft). Wild-growing plants in northern Australia may take eight years to reach this size. A tree can produce 5,000–10,000 fruits a year if grown directly from seed, or up to 30,000 fruits if grafted.

In India, certain cultivars ripen as early as October, while others mature from mid-February to mid-March, in March, or from mid-March through April. In the Asyut Governorate of Egypt, the tree bears fruit twice a year—the main crop in early spring and a second in autumn. Indian orchards typically require two or three hand-pickings from ladders, with a worker able to harvest about 50 kilograms (110 lb) per day. Remaining fruits are shaken from the branches. After being wrapped in white cloth, the fruits are packed into paper-lined burlap sacks for transport to markets across the country.

== Pests and diseases ==
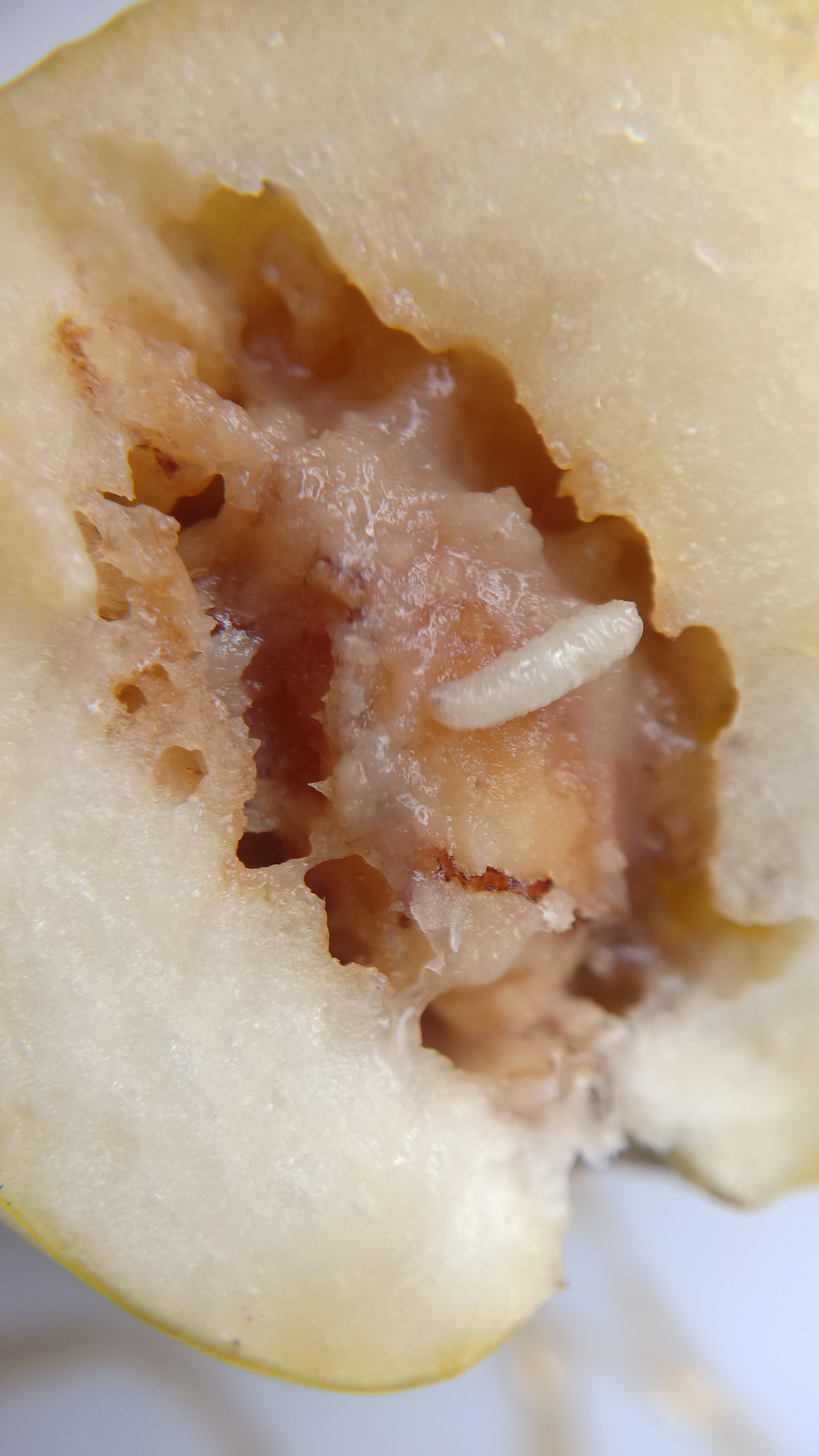
Fruit fly-infested fruit

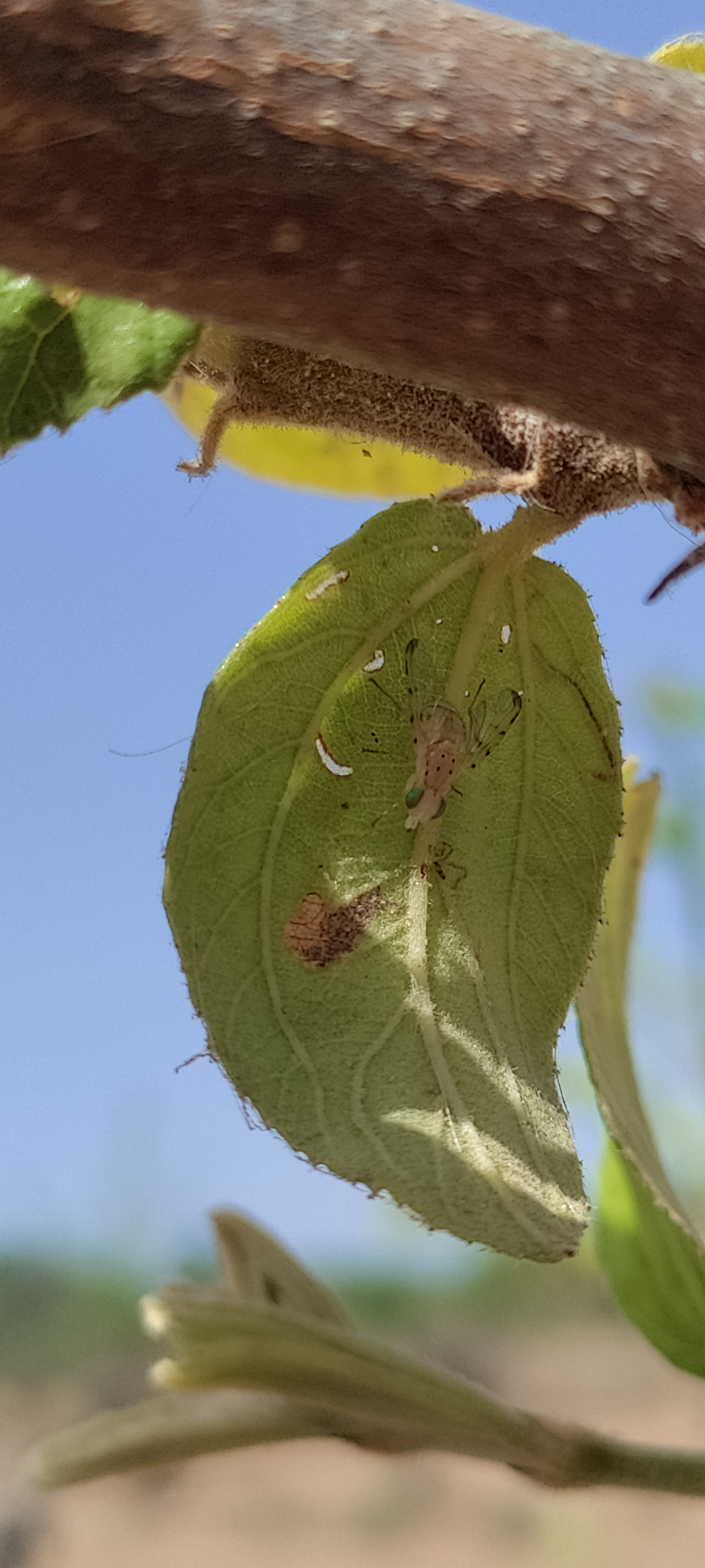
Adult fruit fly on a leaf

Fruit flies are the biggest threat to Z. mauritiana fruits. Some cultivars are more susceptible than others—the flies prefer the largest, sweetest fruits, while a nearby tree bearing smaller, less-sweet fruits suffers little damage. Full-grown larvae exit the fruit by making holes in the skin, and then drop to the ground to form pupae. Control is possible by destroying the pupae with irrigation during summer or subjecting the soil to heat by burning grass, as well as regular application of insecticide.

Caterpillars, especially slug moth larvae attack the foliage. Mites form scale-like galls on twigs, limiting growth and reducing fruit production. Lesser pests include the larvae of Meridarchis scyrodes, which bores into the fruit.

The tree is susceptible to infestation by the parasitic dodder Cuscuta reflexa, which causes considerable damage by extracting nutrients from its host and smothering it. Powdery mildew causes defoliation and fruit-drop, but it can be adequately controlled. Lesser diseases are sooty mould, brown rot and leaf spot. Leaf spot results from infestation by Cercospora spp. and Isariopsis indica var. zizyphi. In 1973, a witches'-broom disease caused by a mycoplasma-like organism was found in ber plants near Poona University. Grafting or budding diseased scions onto healthy Z. mauritiana seedlings was found to be the cause of transmission. Leaf rust, caused by Phakopsora zizyphivulgaris, ranges from mild to severe on all commercial cultivars in Punjab.

In storage, the fruits are susceptible to fungal attack by several species, including Fusarium spp., Nigrospora oryzae, Epicoccum nigrum and Glomerella cingulata.
