= Ron de Ponsigué =

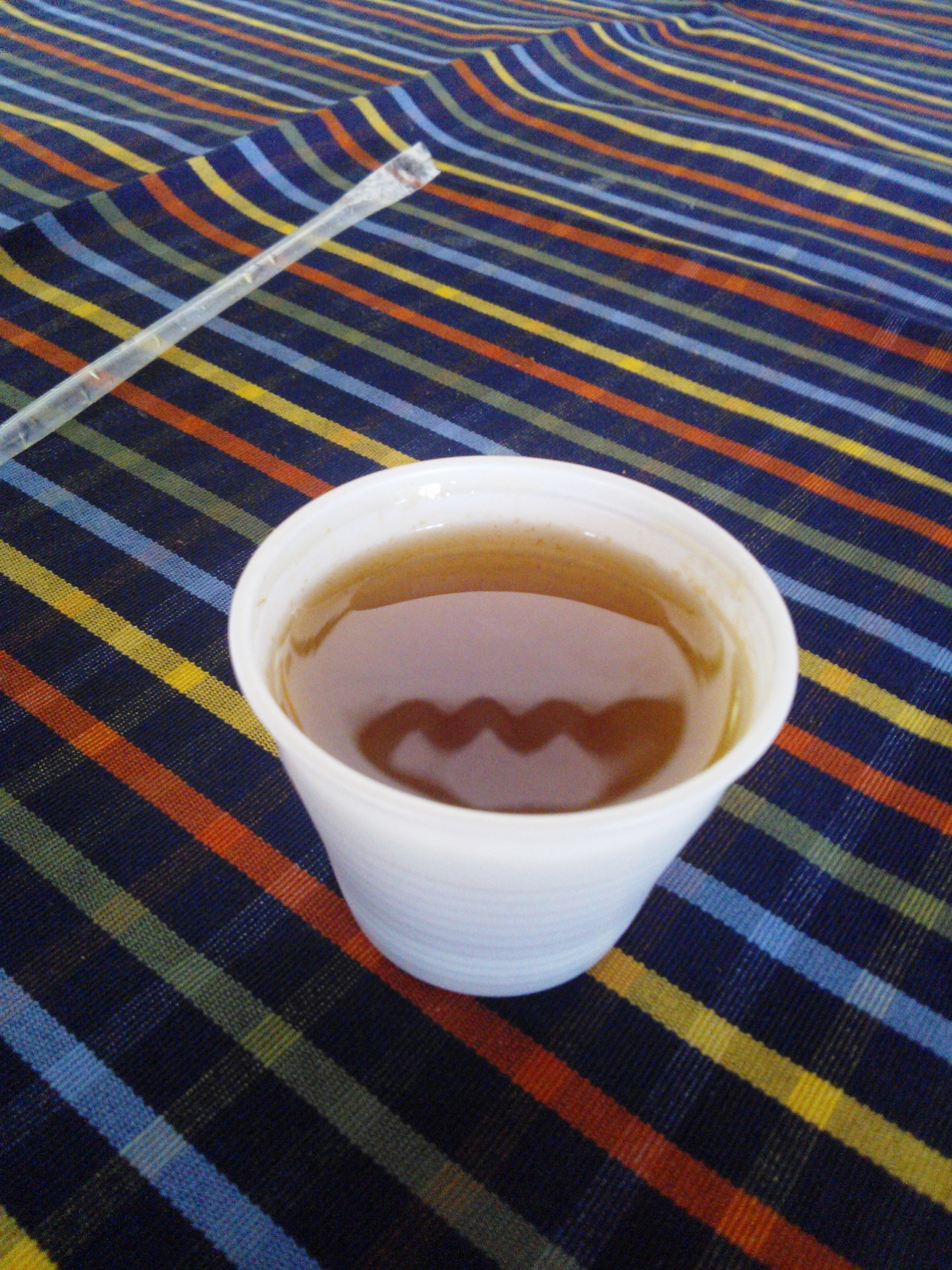
- Origin: Venezuela, Anzoátegui, Sucre, Monagas
- Ingredients: ponsigue, rum/aguardiente

Ron de Ponsigue (also called Ponsigue's liquor) is a traditional alcoholic beverage from eastern Venezuela, particularly the states of Anzoátegui, Sucre, Monagas and Nueva Esparta. It is produced by macerating the local tropical fruit ponsigue (Ziziphus mauritiana), in rum or aguardiente (sugarcane schnapps), resulting in a fruit-flavored liqueur. This beverage is commonly consumed after holidays and at celebrations.

When preparing it, the fruit is usually macerated in a jar of white rum with cloves, sugar, cinnamon and nutmeg, and left to rest for between one month and one year. After this time, it turns a darker colour.

== History ==
Ron de Ponsigue has regional origins tied to rural fruit preservation and home distilling traditions in eastern Venezuela. Local communities historically used available spirits, primarily sugarcane aguardiente or locally produced rum, as a base to macerate seasonal fruit and create flavored liqueurs for household consumption and festival use. Documentation of the drink can be found in regional cultural catalogs and municipal heritage inventories.

== Cultural ==
Ron de Ponsigue is associated with family gatherings, religious and civic holidays, and local festivals in eastern Venezuelan communities. It is served in small glasses as a digestif or celebratory drink and is considered part of regional culinary heritage.

== Notes ==
- Catálogo del Patrimonio Cultural Venezolano 2004–2006. Municipio San José de Guanipa y Municipio Simón Rodríguez, Anzoátegui. Caracas: Impreso, 2006. ISBN 980-6448-50-2. p. 90.
