= Meridarchis luteus =

Scientific classification
- Kingdom: Animalia
- Phylum: Arthropoda
- Clade: Pancrustacea
- Class: Insecta
- Order: Lepidoptera
- Family: Carposinidae
- Genus: Meridarchis
- Species: M. luteus

Binomial name
- Meridarchis luteus (Walsingham, 1897)

Synonyms
- Autogriphus luteus Walsingham, 1897

Species of moth

Meridarchis luteus is a moth in the Carposinidae family. It was described by Walsingham in 1897. It is found in the Central African Republic.
