= Meridarchis oxydelta =

Scientific classification
- Kingdom: Animalia
- Phylum: Arthropoda
- Clade: Pancrustacea
- Class: Insecta
- Order: Lepidoptera
- Family: Carposinidae
- Genus: Meridarchis
- Species: M. oxydelta

Binomial name
- Meridarchis oxydelta Diakonoff, 1967

Species of moth

Meridarchis oxydelta is a moth in the Carposinidae family. It was described by Alexey Diakonoff in 1967. It is found in the Philippines (Luzon).
