= Meridarchis octobola =

Scientific classification
- Kingdom: Animalia
- Phylum: Arthropoda
- Clade: Pancrustacea
- Class: Insecta
- Order: Lepidoptera
- Family: Carposinidae
- Genus: Meridarchis
- Species: M. octobola

Binomial name
- Meridarchis octobola Meyrick, 1925

Species of moth

Meridarchis octobola is a moth in the Carposinidae family. It is found on Buru.
