= Meridarchis pseudomantis =

Scientific classification
- Kingdom: Animalia
- Phylum: Arthropoda
- Clade: Pancrustacea
- Class: Insecta
- Order: Lepidoptera
- Family: Carposinidae
- Genus: Meridarchis
- Species: M. pseudomantis

Binomial name
- Meridarchis pseudomantis Meyrick, 1920

Species of moth

Meridarchis pseudomantis is a moth in the Carposinidae family. It is found in New Guinea.
