= Meridarchis =

Scientific classification
- Kingdom: Animalia
- Phylum: Arthropoda
- Clade: Pancrustacea
- Class: Insecta
- Order: Lepidoptera
- Family: Carposinidae
- Genus: Meridarchis; Zeller, 1867

Synonyms
- Autogriphus Walsingham, 1897; Pexinola Hampson, 1900; Propedesis Walsingham, 1900; Tribonica Meyrick, 1905

Genus of moths

Meridarchis is a genus of moths in the family Carposinidae erected by Philipp Christoph Zeller in 1867.

== Species ==
- Meridarchis alta Diakonoff, 1967
- Meridarchis anisopa Diakonoff, 1954
- Meridarchis bifracta Diakonoff, 1967
- Meridarchis bryodes Meyrick, 1907 (from India)
- Meridarchis bryonephela Meyrick, 1938
- Meridarchis caementaria Meyrick, 1911 (from the Seychelles)
- Meridarchis capnographa Diakonoff, 1954
- Meridarchis celidophora Bradley, 1962
- Meridarchis chionochalca Diakonoff, 1954
- Meridarchis concinna Meyrick, 1913 (from India)
- Meridarchis cosmia Diakonoff, 1954
- Meridarchis creagra Diakonoff, 1949
- Meridarchis cuphoxylon Diakonoff, 1954
- Meridarchis drachmophora Diakonoff, 1950
- Meridarchis ensifera Diakonoff, 1950
- Meridarchis episacta Meyrick, 1906 (from Sri Lanka)
- Meridarchis erebolimnas Meyrick, 1938
- Meridarchis eremitis Meyrick, 1905 (originally in Tribonica)
- Meridarchis excisa Walsingham, 1900 (originally in Propedesis)
- Meridarchis famulata Meyrick, 1913 (from Sri Lanka)
- Meridarchis globifera Meyrick, 1938
- Meridarchis globosa Diakonoff, 1954
- Meridarchis goes Diakonoff, 1954
- Meridarchis heptaspila Meyrick, 1930 (from New Guinea)
- Meridarchis isodina Diakonoff, 1989
- Meridarchis jumboa Kawabe, 1980
- Meridarchis longirostris Hampson, 1900 (originally in Pexinola)
- Meridarchis luteus Walsingham, 1897 (originally in Autogriphus)
- Meridarchis melanantha Diakonoff, 1954
- Meridarchis melanopsacas Diakonoff, 1954
- Meridarchis merga Diakonoff, 1989
- Meridarchis mesosticha Bradley, 1965
- Meridarchis monopa Diakonoff, 1948
- Meridarchis niphoptila Meyrick, 1930 (from New Guinea)
- Meridarchis octobola Meyrick, 1925
- Meridarchis oculosa Diakonoff, 1954
- Meridarchis oxydelta Diakonoff, 1967
- Meridarchis picroscopa Meyrick, 1930
- Meridarchis pentadrachma Diakonoff, 1954
- Meridarchis phaeodelta Meyrick, 1906 (from Sri Lanka)
- Meridarchis pseudomantis Meyrick, 1920
- Meridarchis pusulosa Diakonoff, 1949
- Meridarchis regalis Mey, 2007
- Meridarchis reprobata T. B. Fletcher, 1920
- Meridarchis scyrodes Meyrick, 1916 (from India)
- Meridarchis scythophyes Diakonoff, 1967
- Meridarchis theriosema Meyrick, 1928 (from Papua New Guinea)
- Meridarchis trapeziella Zeller, 1867
- Meridarchis tristriga Diakonoff, 1952 (from Myanmar)
- Meridarchis unitacta Diakonoff, 1970
- Meridarchis wufengensis Li, Wang & Dong, 2001

== Former species ==
- Meridarchis crotalus Diakonoff, 1989
- Meridarchis xerostola Diakonoff, 1983
