= Meridarchis ensifera =

Scientific classification
- Kingdom: Animalia
- Phylum: Arthropoda
- Clade: Pancrustacea
- Class: Insecta
- Order: Lepidoptera
- Family: Carposinidae
- Genus: Meridarchis
- Species: M. ensifera

Binomial name
- Meridarchis ensifera Diakonoff, 1950

Species of moth

Meridarchis ensifera is a moth in the Carposinidae family. It was described by Alexey Diakonoff in 1950. It is found in Sikkim, India.
