= Meridarchis excisa =

Scientific classification
- Kingdom: Animalia
- Phylum: Arthropoda
- Clade: Pancrustacea
- Class: Insecta
- Order: Lepidoptera
- Family: Carposinidae
- Genus: Meridarchis
- Species: M. excisa

Binomial name
- Meridarchis excisa (Walsingham, 1900)

Synonyms
- Propedesis excisa Walsingham, 1900; Meridarchis crotalus Diakonoff, 1989

Species of moth

Meridarchis excisa is a moth in the Carposinidae family. It was described by Walsingham in 1900. It is found in Russia (Primorskii krai) and Japan.
