= Meridarchis caementaria =

Scientific classification
- Kingdom: Animalia
- Phylum: Arthropoda
- Clade: Pancrustacea
- Class: Insecta
- Order: Lepidoptera
- Family: Carposinidae
- Genus: Meridarchis
- Species: M. caementaria

Binomial name
- Meridarchis caementaria Meyrick, 1911

Species of moth

Meridarchis caementaria is a moth in the family Carposinidae. It was described by Edward Meyrick in 1911. It is found on Aldabra in the Seychelles.

This species has a wingspan of 13 mm. The head is whitish ochreous sprinkled with grey. The forewings are pale greyish ochreous sprinkled with grey and blackish, more whitish ochreous on margins; seven small spots of blackish irroration (sprinkles) on the costa, two in the disc at two-fifths and two-thirds, one on submedian fold before tornus and several along termen.
