= Meridarchis theriosema =

Scientific classification
- Kingdom: Animalia
- Phylum: Arthropoda
- Clade: Pancrustacea
- Class: Insecta
- Order: Lepidoptera
- Family: Carposinidae
- Genus: Meridarchis
- Species: M. theriosema

Binomial name
- Meridarchis theriosema Meyrick, 1928

Species of moth

Meridarchis theriosema is a moth in the family Carposinidae. It is found in Papua New Guinea.
