= Colorogenic =

Colorogenic or colourogenic describes a property of chemical compounds which are initially not colored (i.e. they show negligible absorbance of visible light), but become colored through a chemical reaction, often through an intermolecular covalent reaction that either covalently binds the now colored compound to a target molecule, or through a reaction which leads to a colored non-covalently bound product. Colorogenic reagents are often used for qualitative testing for the presence of chemical functional groups. Colorogenic labeling reagents are sometimes used in analytical chemistry procedures, for example in HPLC or CE to derivative target compounds (e.g. labeling the primary amines of polypeptides), however the enhanced sensitivity from the analogous fluorogenic reagents, leads colorogenic reagents to be less frequently used in quantitative applications.

== Examples ==
- Ninhydrin
- Ellman's reagent
- PNPP

== See also ==
- Fluorogenic
