= Meridarchis creagra =

Scientific classification
- Kingdom: Animalia
- Phylum: Arthropoda
- Clade: Pancrustacea
- Class: Insecta
- Order: Lepidoptera
- Family: Carposinidae
- Genus: Meridarchis
- Species: M. creagra

Binomial name
- Meridarchis creagra Diakonoff, 1949

Species of moth

Meridarchis creagra is a moth in the family Carposinidae. It was described by Alexey Diakonoff in 1949. It is found on Sumatra.
