= Meridarchis heptaspila =

Scientific classification
- Kingdom: Animalia
- Phylum: Arthropoda
- Clade: Pancrustacea
- Class: Insecta
- Order: Lepidoptera
- Family: Carposinidae
- Genus: Meridarchis
- Species: M. heptaspila

Binomial name
- Meridarchis heptaspila Meyrick, 1930

Species of moth

Meridarchis heptaspila is a moth in the family Carposinidae. It was described by Edward Meyrick in 1930. It is found on New Guinea.
