= Meridarchis isodina =

Scientific classification
- Kingdom: Animalia
- Phylum: Arthropoda
- Clade: Pancrustacea
- Class: Insecta
- Order: Lepidoptera
- Family: Carposinidae
- Genus: Meridarchis
- Species: M. isodina

Binomial name
- Meridarchis isodina Diakonoff, 1989

Species of moth

Meridarchis isodina is a moth in the Carposinidae family. It was described by Alexey Diakonoff in 1989. It is found in China (Shensi).
