= Meridarchis bryonephela =

Scientific classification
- Kingdom: Animalia
- Phylum: Arthropoda
- Clade: Pancrustacea
- Class: Insecta
- Order: Lepidoptera
- Family: Carposinidae
- Genus: Meridarchis
- Species: M. bryonephela

Binomial name
- Meridarchis bryonephela Meyrick, 1938

Species of moth

Meridarchis bryonephela is a moth in the family Carposinidae. It was described by Edward Meyrick in 1938. It is found in Yunnan, China.
