= Meridarchis drachmophora =

Scientific classification
- Kingdom: Animalia
- Phylum: Arthropoda
- Clade: Pancrustacea
- Class: Insecta
- Order: Lepidoptera
- Family: Carposinidae
- Genus: Meridarchis
- Species: M. drachmophora

Binomial name
- Meridarchis drachmophora Diakonoff, 1950

Species of moth

Meridarchis drachmophora is a moth in the Carposinidae family. It was described by Alexey Diakonoff in 1950. It is found in New Guinea.

This species has a wingspan of 32 mm. The forewings are glossy ochreous, densely scattered with brown.
