= Meridarchis picroscopa =

Scientific classification
- Kingdom: Animalia
- Phylum: Arthropoda
- Clade: Pancrustacea
- Class: Insecta
- Order: Lepidoptera
- Family: Carposinidae
- Genus: Meridarchis
- Species: M. picroscopa

Binomial name
- Meridarchis picroscopa Meyrick, 1930

Species of moth

Meridarchis picroscopa is a moth in the family Carposinidae. It is found in New Guinea.
