= Meridarchis wufengensis =

Scientific classification
- Kingdom: Animalia
- Phylum: Arthropoda
- Clade: Pancrustacea
- Class: Insecta
- Order: Lepidoptera
- Family: Carposinidae
- Genus: Meridarchis
- Species: M. wufengensis

Binomial name
- Meridarchis wufengensis Li, Wang & Dong, 2001

Species of moth

Meridarchis wufengensis is a moth in the Carposinidae family. It is found in China.
