= Meridarchis episacta =

Scientific classification
- Kingdom: Animalia
- Phylum: Arthropoda
- Clade: Pancrustacea
- Class: Insecta
- Order: Lepidoptera
- Family: Carposinidae
- Genus: Meridarchis
- Species: M. episacta

Binomial name
- Meridarchis episacta Meyrick, 1906

Species of moth

Meridarchis episacta is a moth in the family Carposinidae. It was described by Edward Meyrick in 1906. It is found in Sri Lanka and on Java in Indonesia.
