= Meridarchis goes =

Scientific classification
- Kingdom: Animalia
- Phylum: Arthropoda
- Clade: Pancrustacea
- Class: Insecta
- Order: Lepidoptera
- Family: Carposinidae
- Genus: Meridarchis
- Species: M. goes

Binomial name
- Meridarchis goes Diakonoff, 1954

Species of moth

Meridarchis goes is a moth in the Carposinidae family. It was described by Alexey Diakonoff in 1954. It is found in New Guinea.
