= Meridarchis regalis =

Scientific classification
- Kingdom: Animalia
- Phylum: Arthropoda
- Clade: Pancrustacea
- Class: Insecta
- Order: Lepidoptera
- Family: Carposinidae
- Genus: Meridarchis
- Species: M. regalis

Binomial name
- Meridarchis regalis Mey, 2007

Species of moth

Meridarchis regalis is a moth in the family Carposinidae. It was described by Wolfram Mey in 2007. It is found in Namibia.
