= Meridarchis reprobata =

Scientific classification
- Kingdom: Animalia
- Phylum: Arthropoda
- Clade: Pancrustacea
- Class: Insecta
- Order: Lepidoptera
- Family: Carposinidae
- Genus: Meridarchis
- Species: M. reprobata

Binomial name
- Meridarchis reprobata T. B. Fletcher, 1920

Species of moth

Meridarchis reprobata is a moth in the family Carposinidae described by Thomas Bainbrigge Fletcher in 1920. It is found in India.
