= Meridarchis concinna =

Scientific classification
- Kingdom: Animalia
- Phylum: Arthropoda
- Clade: Pancrustacea
- Class: Insecta
- Order: Lepidoptera
- Family: Carposinidae
- Genus: Meridarchis
- Species: M. concinna

Binomial name
- Meridarchis concinna Meyrick, 1913

Species of moth

Meridarchis concinna is a moth in the family Carposinidae. It was described by Edward Meyrick in 1913. It is found in Assam, India.
