= Meridarchis longirostris =

Scientific classification
- Kingdom: Animalia
- Phylum: Arthropoda
- Clade: Pancrustacea
- Class: Insecta
- Order: Lepidoptera
- Family: Carposinidae
- Genus: Meridarchis
- Species: M. longirostris

Binomial name
- Meridarchis longirostris Hampson, 1900

Species of moth

Meridarchis longirostris is a moth in the family Carposinidae. It was described by George Hampson in 1900. It is found in Tibet.
