= Meridarchis tristriga =

Scientific classification
- Kingdom: Animalia
- Phylum: Arthropoda
- Clade: Pancrustacea
- Class: Insecta
- Order: Lepidoptera
- Family: Carposinidae
- Genus: Meridarchis
- Species: M. tristriga

Binomial name
- Meridarchis tristriga Diakonoff, 1952

Species of moth

Meridarchis tristriga is a moth in the Carposinidae family. It is found in Burma.
