= Meridarchis phaeodelta =

Scientific classification
- Kingdom: Animalia
- Phylum: Arthropoda
- Clade: Pancrustacea
- Class: Insecta
- Order: Lepidoptera
- Family: Carposinidae
- Genus: Meridarchis
- Species: M. phaeodelta

Binomial name
- Meridarchis phaeodelta Meyrick, 1906

Species of moth

Meridarchis phaeodelta is a moth in the Carposinidae family. It is found in India and Sri Lanka.
