= Meridarchis niphoptila =

Scientific classification
- Kingdom: Animalia
- Phylum: Arthropoda
- Clade: Pancrustacea
- Class: Insecta
- Order: Lepidoptera
- Family: Carposinidae
- Genus: Meridarchis
- Species: M. niphoptila

Binomial name
- Meridarchis niphoptila Meyrick, 1930

Species of moth

Meridarchis niphoptila is a moth in the Carposinidae family. It is found in New Guinea.
