= Meridarchis unitacta =

Scientific classification
- Kingdom: Animalia
- Phylum: Arthropoda
- Clade: Pancrustacea
- Class: Insecta
- Order: Lepidoptera
- Family: Carposinidae
- Genus: Meridarchis
- Species: M. unitacta

Binomial name
- Meridarchis unitacta Diakonoff, 1970

Species of moth

Meridarchis unitacta is a moth in the Carposinidae family. It is found in Madagascar.

This species has a wingspan of 19mm, and is characterized by its long, narrow wings, and black irrorated markings appearing greyish except for a jet-black dot below the end of the posterior side of costal triangle.
