= Meridarchis merga =

Scientific classification
- Kingdom: Animalia
- Phylum: Arthropoda
- Clade: Pancrustacea
- Class: Insecta
- Order: Lepidoptera
- Family: Carposinidae
- Genus: Meridarchis
- Species: M. merga

Binomial name
- Meridarchis merga Diakonoff, 1989

Species of moth

Meridarchis merga is a moth in the Carposinidae family. It was described by Alexey Diakonoff in 1989. It is found in Japan.
