= Meridarchis eremitis =

Scientific classification
- Kingdom: Animalia
- Phylum: Arthropoda
- Clade: Pancrustacea
- Class: Insecta
- Order: Lepidoptera
- Family: Carposinidae
- Genus: Meridarchis
- Species: M. eremitis

Binomial name
- Meridarchis eremitis (Meyrick, 1905)

Synonyms
- Tribonica eremitis Meyrick, 1905

Species of moth

Meridarchis eremitis is a moth in the family Carposinidae. It was described by Edward Meyrick in 1905. It is found in Sri Lanka.

This species has a wingspan of 17–24 mm.
