= Meridarchis pusulosa =

Scientific classification
- Kingdom: Animalia
- Phylum: Arthropoda
- Clade: Pancrustacea
- Class: Insecta
- Order: Lepidoptera
- Family: Carposinidae
- Genus: Meridarchis
- Species: M. pusulosa

Binomial name
- Meridarchis pusulosa Diakonoff, 1949

Species of moth

Meridarchis pusulosa is a moth in the Carposinidae family. It is found on Java.
