= Meridarchis celidophora =

Scientific classification
- Kingdom: Animalia
- Phylum: Arthropoda
- Clade: Pancrustacea
- Class: Insecta
- Order: Lepidoptera
- Family: Carposinidae
- Genus: Meridarchis
- Species: M. celidophora

Binomial name
- Meridarchis celidophora Bradley, 1962

Species of moth

Meridarchis celidophora is a moth in the Carposinidae family. It was described by John David Bradley in 1962. It is found on Vanuatu in the South Pacific.
