= Meridarchis jumboa =

Scientific classification
- Kingdom: Animalia
- Phylum: Arthropoda
- Clade: Pancrustacea
- Class: Insecta
- Order: Lepidoptera
- Family: Carposinidae
- Genus: Meridarchis
- Species: M. jumboa

Binomial name
- Meridarchis jumboa Kawabe, 1980

Species of moth

Meridarchis jumboa is a moth in the Carposinidae family. It was described by Kawabe in 1980. It is found in Japan.
