= Meridarchis globifera =

Scientific classification
- Kingdom: Animalia
- Phylum: Arthropoda
- Clade: Pancrustacea
- Class: Insecta
- Order: Lepidoptera
- Family: Carposinidae
- Genus: Meridarchis
- Species: M. globifera

Binomial name
- Meridarchis globifera Meyrick, 1938

Species of moth

Meridarchis globifera is a moth in the family Carposinidae. It was described by Edward Meyrick in 1938. It is found in Papua New Guinea.
