= Meridarchis mesosticha =

Scientific classification
- Kingdom: Animalia
- Phylum: Arthropoda
- Clade: Pancrustacea
- Class: Insecta
- Order: Lepidoptera
- Family: Carposinidae
- Genus: Meridarchis
- Species: M. mesosticha

Binomial name
- Meridarchis mesosticha Bradley, 1965

Species of moth

Meridarchis mesosticha is a moth in the Carposinidae family. It was described by John David Bradley in 1965 and is found in Uganda.
