= 3-(4-Carboxybenzoyl)quinoline-2-carboxaldehyde =

Fluorogenic amine labelling dye

CBQCA

Names
- Preferred IUPAC name 4-(2-Formylquinoline-3-carbonyl)benzoic acid
- Other names CBQCA, ATTO-TAG CBQCA

Identifiers
CAS Number	131124-59-9
3D model (JSmol)	Interactive image
ChEBI	CHEBI:51934
ChemSpider	111618
PubChem CID	125448
CompTox Dashboard (EPA)	DTXSID70156907
- InChI: InChI=1S/C18H11NO4/c20-10-16-14(9-13-3-1-2-4-15(13)19-16)17(21)11-5-7-12(8-6-11)18(22)23/h1-10H,(H,22,23) Key: MWNLTKCQHFZFHN-UHFFFAOYSA-N
- SMILES: C1=CC=C2C(=C1)C=C(C(=N2)C=O)C(=O)C3=CC=C(C=C3)C(=O)O

Properties
Chemical formula	C_{18}H_{11}NO_{4}
Molar mass	305.289 g·mol^{−1}
- Except where otherwise noted, data are given for materials in their standard state (at 25 °C [77 °F], 100 kPa). Infobox references

3-(4-Carboxybenzoyl)quinoline-2-carboxaldehyde (CBQCA) is a fluorogenic amine labeling dye that is not fluorescent itself, but covalently reacts with primary amines to form fluorescent products. It was first reported in 1991.

CBQCA is largely used in the context of quantifying peptides or proteins. Either cyanide or thiols are required as a co-substrate in the fluorogenic reaction, although thiols also react with and mask the CBQCA aldehyde thereby preventing the fluorogenic reaction against the targeted primary amines. Once bound to protein the excitation wavelength is 465 nm (blue) and the emission wavelength is ~550 nm (green).

== Reaction ==
CBQCA, which is non-fluorescent, reacts with primary amines in the presence of cyanide to form fluorescent products:

== See also ==
- 3-(2-Furoyl)quinoline-2-carboxaldehyde (FQ)
