= Ellman's reagent =

Names
- Preferred IUPAC name 5,5′-Disulfanediylbis(2-nitrobenzoic acid)
- Other names 3,3′-Disulfanediylbis(6-nitrobenzoic acid); 5-(3-Carboxy-4-nitrophenyl)disulfanyl-2-nitrobenzoic acid Dithionitrobenzoic acid 5,5′-Dithiobis(2-nitrobenzoic acid)

Identifiers
CAS Number	69-78-3
3D model (JSmol)	Interactive image
Abbreviations	DTNB
ChEBI	CHEBI:86228
ChEMBL	ChEMBL395814
ChemSpider	6018
ECHA InfoCard	100.000.650
EC Number	200-714-4
PubChem CID	6254
UNII	9BZQ3U62JX
CompTox Dashboard (EPA)	DTXSID5058779
- InChI: InChI=1S/C14H8N2O8S2/c17-13(18)9-5-7(1-3-11(9)15(21)22)25-26-8-2-4-12(16(23)24)10(6-8)14(19)20/h1-6H,(H,17,18)(H,19,20) Key: KIUMMUBSPKGMOY-UHFFFAOYSA-N; InChI=1/C14H8N2O8S2/c17-13(18)9-5-7(1-3-11(9)15(21)22)25-26-8-2-4-12(16(23)24)10(6-8)14(19)20/h1-6H,(H,17,18)(H,19,20) Key: KIUMMUBSPKGMOY-UHFFFAOYAD
- SMILES: c1cc(c(cc1SSc2ccc(c(c2)C(=O)O)[N+](=O)[O-])C(=O)O)[N+](=O)[O-]

Properties
Chemical formula	C_{14}H_{8}N_{2}O_{8}S_{2}
Molar mass	396.34 g·mol^{−1}
Melting point	240 to 245 °C (464 to 473 °F; 513 to 518 K) (decomposes)

Hazards
- GHS labelling
Pictograms	(GHS07: Exclamation mark)
Signal word	Warning
Hazard statements	H315, H319, H335
Precautionary statements	P261, P264, P271, P280, P302+P352, P304+P340, P305+P351+P338, P312, P321, P332+P313, P337+P313, P362, P403+P233, P405, P501
- Except where otherwise noted, data are given for materials in their standard state (at 25 °C [77 °F], 100 kPa). verify (what is ?) Infobox references

Ellman's reagent (5,5′-dithiobis-(2-nitrobenzoic acid) or DTNB) is a colorogenic chemical used to quantify the number or concentration of thiol groups in a sample. It was developed by George L. Ellman.

== Preparation ==
In Ellman's original paper, he prepared this reagent by oxidizing 2-nitro-5-chlorobenzaldehyde to the carboxylic acid, introducing the thiol via sodium sulfide, and coupling the monomer by oxidization with iodine. Today, this reagent is readily available commercially.

== Ellman's test ==
Thiols react with this compound, cleaving the disulfide bond to give 2-nitro-5-thiobenzoate (TNB^{−}), which ionizes to the TNB^{2−} dianion in water at neutral and alkaline pH. This TNB^{2−} ion has a yellow color.

Reaction of DTNB with a thiol (R-SH).

This reaction is rapid and stoichiometric, with the addition of one mole of thiol releasing one mole of TNB. The TNB^{2−} is quantified in a spectrophotometer by measuring the absorbance of visible light at 412 nm, using an extinction coefficient of 14,150 M^{−1} cm^{−1} for dilute buffer solutions, and a coefficient of 13,700 M^{−1} cm^{−1} for high salt concentrations, such as 6 M guanidinium hydrochloride or 8 M urea. Ellman's original 1959 publication estimated the molar extinction at 13,600 M^{−1} cm^{−1}, and this value can be found in some modern applications of the method despite improved determinations. Commercial DTNB may not be completely pure, so may require recrystallization to obtain completely accurate and reproducible results.

Ellman's reagent can be used for measuring low-molecular mass thiols such as glutathione in both pure solutions and biological samples, such as blood. It can also measure the number of thiol groups on proteins.
