= Fluorescamine =

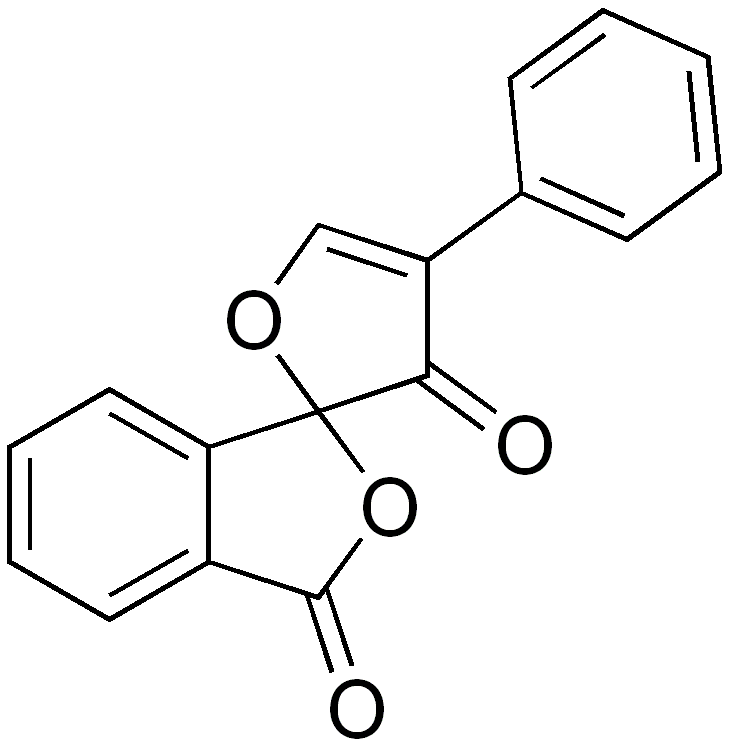

Names
- IUPAC name 4'-phenylspiro[2-benzofuran-3,2'-furan]-1,3'-dione
- Other names Fluram

Identifiers
CAS Number	38183-12-9
3D model (JSmol)	Interactive image
ChemSpider	34768
ECHA InfoCard	100.048.904
MeSH	D005450
PubChem CID	37927
UNII	Y6859V58YW
CompTox Dashboard (EPA)	DTXSID50872017
- InChI: InChI=1S/C17H10O4/c18-15-13(11-6-2-1-3-7-11)10-20-17(15)14-9-5-4-8-12(14)16(19)21-17/h1-10H Key: ZFKJVJIDPQDDFY-UHFFFAOYSA-N
- SMILES: C1=CC=C(C=C1)C2=COC3(C2=O)C4=CC=CC=C4C(=O)O3

Properties
Chemical formula	C_{17}H_{10}O_{4}
Molar mass	278.263 g·mol^{−1}
Melting point	153 to 157 °C (307 to 315 °F; 426 to 430 K)
- Except where otherwise noted, data are given for materials in their standard state (at 25 °C [77 °F], 100 kPa). verify (what is ?) Infobox references

Fluorescamine is a spiro compound that is not fluorescent itself, but reacts with primary amines to form highly fluorescent products, i.e. it is fluorogenic. It hence has been used as a reagent for the detection of amines and peptides. 1-100 μg of protein and down to 10 pg of protein can be detected. Once bound to protein the excitation wavelength is 381 nm (near ultraviolet) and the emission wavelength is 470 nm (blue). This method is found to suffer from high blanks resulting from a high rate of hydrolysis due to requiring a large excess concentration. Alternative methods are based on ortho-phthalaldehyde (OPA), Ellman's reagent (DTNB), or epicocconone.

== Reaction ==
Reaction of fluorescamine with an amine

== See also ==
- 3-(2-Furoyl)quinoline-2-carboxaldehyde (FQ)
