= Meridarchis scyrodes =

Scientific classification
- Kingdom: Animalia
- Phylum: Arthropoda
- Clade: Pancrustacea
- Class: Insecta
- Order: Lepidoptera
- Family: Carposinidae
- Genus: Meridarchis
- Species: M. scyrodes

Binomial name
- Meridarchis scyrodes Meyrick, 1916

Synonyms
- Meridarchis reprobata Meyrick, 1920

Species of moth

Meridarchis scyrodes is a moth in the Carposinidae family. It is found in India and Thailand.
