= Flavipin =

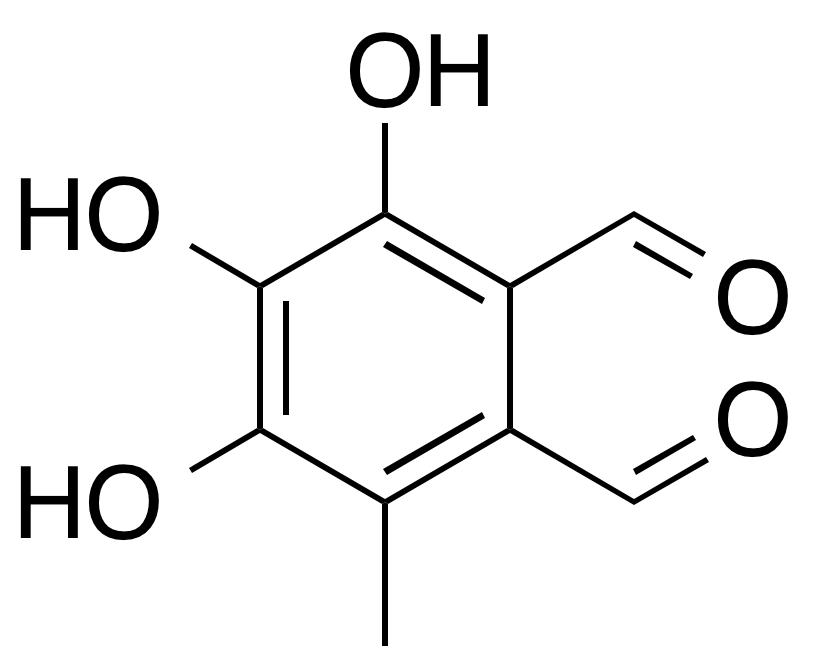

Names
- Preferred IUPAC name 3,4,5-Trihydroxy-6-methylbenzene-1,2-dicarbaldehyde
- Other names: 3,4,5-Trihydroxy-6-methylphthalaldehyde; HY-N10295

Identifiers
CAS Number	483-53-4
3D model (JSmol)	Interactive image
ChemSpider	2340768
PubChem CID	3083587
UNII	GY59MD7DBM
CompTox Dashboard (EPA)	DTXSID50197479
- InChI: InChI=1S/C9H8O5/c1-4-5(2-10)6(3-11)8(13)9(14)7(4)12/h2-3,12-14H,1H3 Key: COJARPHAKVBMFD-UHFFFAOYSA-N
- SMILES: CC1=C(C(=C(C(=C1O)O)O)C=O)C=O

Properties
Chemical formula	C_{9}H_{8}O_{5}
Molar mass	196.158 g·mol^{−1}
- Except where otherwise noted, data are given for materials in their standard state (at 25 °C [77 °F], 100 kPa). Infobox references

Flavipin is a phototoxic, antibiotic and antifungal metabolite with the molecular formula C_{9}H_{8}O_{5} which is produced by the fungi Aspergillus flavipes, Epicoccum nigrum and Epicoccum andropogonis. Flavipin is also a potent antioxidant.
