= Epicocconone =

Names
- Preferred IUPAC name (6S,9aS)-6-(Hydroxymethyl)-3-[(1Z,4E,6E,8E)-1-hydroxy-3-oxodeca-1,4,6,8-tetraen-1-yl]-9a-methyl-5,6-dihydro-2H-furo[3,2-g][2]benzopyran-2,9(9aH)-dione
- Other names Deep Purple Lava Purple Lightning Fast

Identifiers
CAS Number	371163-96-1
3D model (JSmol)	Interactive image
ChEBI	CHEBI:51226
ChemSpider	8398759
PubChem CID	56464320
UNII	6QLH9631R8
- InChI: InChI=1S/C23H22O7/c1-3-4-5-6-7-8-15(25)11-19(26)20-18-10-14-9-16(12-24)29-13-17(14)21(27)23(18,2)30-22(20)28/h3-8,10-11,13,16,24,26H,9,12H2,1-2H3/b4-3+,6-5+,8-7+,19-11-/t16-,23-/m0/s1 Key: JKMBMIMLVFMXRW-LYYFRFARSA-N; InChI=1/C23H22O7/c1-3-4-5-6-7-8-15(25)11-19(26)20-18-10-14-9-16(12-24)29-13-17(14)21(27)23(18,2)30-22(20)28/h3-8,10-11,13,16,24,26H,9,12H2,1-2H3/b4-3+,6-5+,8-7+,19-11-/t16-,23-/m0/s1 Key: JKMBMIMLVFMXRW-LYYFRFARBG
- SMILES: C/C=C/C=C/C=C/C(=O)/C=C(/C1=C2C=C3C[C@H](OC=C3C(=O)[C@]2(OC1=O)C)CO)\O

Properties
Chemical formula	C_{23}H_{22}O_{7}
Molar mass	410.422 g·mol^{−1}
- Except where otherwise noted, data are given for materials in their standard state (at 25 °C [77 °F], 100 kPa). Infobox references

Epicocconone is a long Stokes' shift fluorogenic natural product found in the fungus Epicoccum nigrum. Though weakly fluorescent in water (green emission, 520 nm) it reacts covalently yet reversibly with primary amines such as those in proteins to yield a product with a strong orange-red emission (610 nm). Epicoconone is notable because it is the first covalent/reversible/turn-on fluorophore to be discovered and is a natural product with a new fluorescent scaffold. It is also cell membrane permeable, unlike many other fluorophores, and subsequently can be used in in vivo (live cell) applications. Additionally, this dye can be used as a sensitive total protein stain for 1D and 2D electrophoresis, quantitative determination of protein concentration, making it a powerful loading control for Western blots.

== Synthetic variant ==
In addition to the natural variant from the fungus, there are several synthetic analogs. With respect to protein staining properties there are few differences between natural and synthetic analogs.
