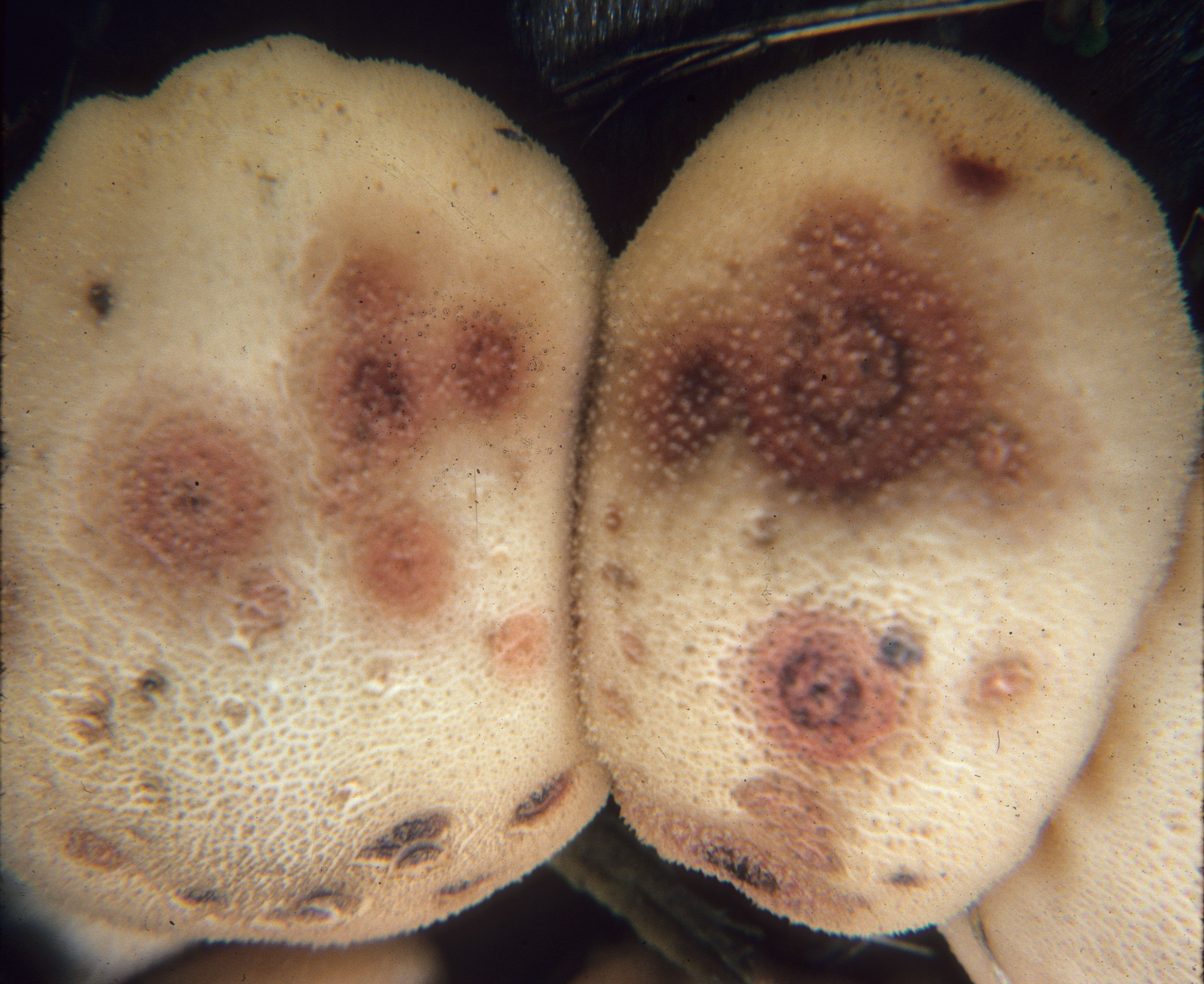
- E. nigrum growing on Lycoperdon pyriforme

Scientific classification
- Kingdom: Fungi
- Division: Ascomycota
- Class: Dothideomycetes
- Order: Pleosporales
- Family: Didymellaceae
- Genus: Epicoccum
- Species: E. nigrum

Binomial name
- Epicoccum nigrum Link

Synonyms
- Epicoccum purpurascens Ehrenb. Epicoccum vulgare Corda; Phoma epicoccina Punith. Toruloidea tobaica Svilv.

= Epicoccum nigrum =

Species of fungus

Epicoccum nigrum is a species of fungus in the phylum Ascomycota. A plant pathogen and endophyte, it is a widespread fungus which produces coloured pigments that can be used as antifungal agents against other pathogenic fungi. The fluorescent stain epicocconone is extracted from it.

== Growth and morphology ==
Epicoccum nigrum (1825) is a fungus with no known teleomorph form. It has been classified as a member of the Hyphomycetes, in the Deuteromycota, as well as the Fungi Imperfecti because it is only known to reproduce asexually. Despite that it is not yeast-like, it has been included in the broad, unrelated category of fungi known as black yeasts. The fungus grows felty colonies in bright shades of yellow, orange, and red, often with brown or black throughout. Colonies grow quickly, reaching about 6 cm in diameter in 2 days at room temperature. Mycelia contain both chitin and cellulose.

Epicoccum nigrum forms blastoconidia that are darkly coloured, warted and spherical, reaching 15 to 25 μm in diameter. Conidia grow on a sporodochium, formed by warty and fibrous hyphae. Sporets have been found to contain up to 15 cells. The spores of E. nigrum are actively released depending on temperature, light, and relative humidity conditions. The mechanism of release involves the separation of the conidium from the sporodochium via a double septum. It capitalizes on the spherical shape of the conidia, allowing it to "bounce" off the sporodochium. Conidia then become airborne with movement or wind. Sporulation is induced under Wood's light, or sometimes upon exposure to cold temperatures with a subsequent return to room temperature. Pigment production is also sensitive to light and temperature changes. Ideal growth temperatures range between 23–28 °C (73–82 °F), and ideal growth pH ranges from 5.0 to 6.0. Although E. nigrum will grow in a range of water activity (aw of 0.99 to 0.97), growth is optimized at water vapour saturation.

Epicoccum nigrum produces a variety of biomedically and industrially useful metabolites, including important antifungal agents and pigments, including: flavipin, epicorazines A and B, epirodin, epicocconone, and a variety of carotenoid pigments. Epicoccum nigrum has also been utilized in the biosynthetic manufacture of silver- and gold nanoparticles.

== Habitat and ecology ==
A highly robust and ubiquitous fungus, E. nigrum has an almost global spread, occurring in the Americas, Asia, and Europe. Spores of E. nigrum have been cultured from a variety of environments, predominantly soil (i.e. peat, forest floor, raw humus, compost, tundra, sewage) and sand (e.g., dunes, saline sands). It is a saprophytic fungus, forming pustules (composed of sporodochia and conidia) on dead and dying plants. This species is commonly found growing on cereals and seeds, as well as other crops including corn, beans, potatoes, peas and peaches. It has been found to grow colonies on leaves submersed in water as cold as 0 °C (32 °F), and is considered a facultative marine fungus. It is capable of colonizing algae and marsh grasses. In indoor environments, E. nigrum has been found on paintings and wallpaper, cotton and textiles, in dust, and in air. It is tolerant of changes in water availability, and hyphal growth has been found to resume within an hour of exposure to water.

== Biomedical, industrial, and agricultural uses ==
Epicoccum nigrum has a wide array of medical, industrial, and agricultural applications. It produces a variety of pigmented and non-pigmented antifungal and antibacterial compounds. These antimicrobial compounds are effective against other fungi and bacteria present in soil. Flavipin, and epirodins A and B are pigmented antifungal agents; non-pigmented compounds include epicorazines A and B. Endophytic fungi such as E. nigrum are being explored as alternative sources of antibiotics to treat important resistant infections. Polysaccharide antioxidants are also produced by E. nigrum. Epicocconone is a fluorescent pigment unique to E. nigrum. Epicocconone is valuable in terms of its ability to pigment cells orange, which then fluoresce red without impacting cell structure or function.

Industrially, E. nigrum has a variety of broad applications. It has demonstrated a capacity to biosynthesize nanoparticles from silver and gold, which have applications in chemical, industrial, and medical processes. It has been applied as biological treatment for mechanical oily effluent, reducing the content of hydrogen peroxide, phenols, and chemical oxygen demand in the oily effluent. Epicoccum nigrum pigments have been considered as natural replacements for artificial pigments currently used in food. It produces a variety of pigments, ranging from darker oranges to yellows and greens. These pigments were synthesized by nonpathogenic strains of E. nigrum.

In Brazil, E. nigrum is used to support root growth and control sugarcane pathogens. It is a biocontrol antifungal agent active against brown rot in stone fruit, caused the species Monilinia laxa and Monilinia fructigena. In contrast to these uses for E. nigrum metabolites, there has been an investigation into methods of controlling E. nigrum fungal colonies that have contaminated historic and cultural artifacts. The fungus was found to be quite sensitive to essential oils from plants such as lavender and rosemary. This is important in terms of the preservation of artifacts in humid climates, where fungal growth is an important determinant in the deterioration of stone structures and wood frames.

== Epidemiology ==
Epicoccum nigrum produces the glycoprotein allergen Epi p 1 which binds to IgE, sometimes cross-reacting with other fungal allergens. Cross-reactivity was found to exist with Alternaria alternata, Curvularia lunata, Cladosporium herbarum, and Penicillium citrinum. Epicoccum nigrum is associated with respiratory fungal allergies, including allergic asthma, rhinitis, hypersensitivity pneumonitis, and allergic fungal sinusitis. Two pediatric cases of hypersensitivity pneumonitis caused by E. nigrum were reported in children living in a damp and mouldy home, with daily exposure to E. nigrum in the shower. The fungus has been found on human skin and in spit samples. It does not typically cause systemic infection, although one case has been reported in an immunocompromised patient.

== History and reclassification ==
Epicoccum nigrum has been treated under a variety of names in the genus Epicoccum. It was first identified in 1815 by botanist Johaan Heinrich Friedrich Link. Today, all previously identified species are considered to be different variants of the species E. nigrum. These include: E. purpurascens, E. diversisporum, E. versicolor, E. vulgare, E. granulatum, E. menispermi, and E. neglectum. More recently, two distinct genotypes for E. nigrum have been identified with the combined use of DNA sequencing, morphology, physiology, and recombination factors. This indicates the existence of cryptic species, and a subsequent call to re-classify E. nigrum into more than one species.
