= 3-(2-Furoyl)quinoline-2-carboxaldehyde =

Fluorogenic amine labelling dye

FQ

Names
- Preferred IUPAC name 3-(Furan-2-carbonyl)quinoline-2-carbaldehyde
- Other names FQ, (3-(2-furoyl)-quinoline-2 carboxaldehyde), ATTO-TAG FQ, FQCA

Identifiers
CAS Number	126769-01-5
3D model (JSmol)	Interactive image
ChemSpider	110807
EC Number	635-028-8
PubChem CID	124404
CompTox Dashboard (EPA)	DTXSID10155292
- InChI: InChI=1S/C15H9NO3/c17-9-13-11(15(18)14-6-3-7-19-14)8-10-4-1-2-5-12(10)16-13/h1-9H Key: PNCHURHVMDRFTR-UHFFFAOYSA-N
- SMILES: C1=CC=C2C(=C1)C=C(C(=N2)C=O)C(=O)C3=CC=CO3

Properties
Chemical formula	C_{15}H_{9}NO_{3}
Molar mass	251.241 g·mol^{−1}
- Except where otherwise noted, data are given for materials in their standard state (at 25 °C [77 °F], 100 kPa). Infobox references

3-(2-Furoyl)-quinoline-2-carboxaldehyde (FQ) is a fluorogenic amine labeling dye that is not fluorescent itself, but reacts with primary amines to form fluorescent products. It was first reported in 1990. Cyanide, typically provided via KCN or NaCN salts, is a required co-substrate in the fluorogenic reaction. It has been used for the detection of amines and peptides, largely in CE-SDS, where it is recognized to reach a silver stain-like high sensitivity via laser-induced fluorescence. Once bound to protein the excitation wavelength is 480 nm (blue) and the emission wavelength is ~600 nm (orange).

== See also ==
- CBQCA
- Fluorescamine
- Py-1
