= Fluorogenic =

Fluorogenic describes a property of chemical compounds which are initially not fluorescent, but become fluorescent through a chemical reaction, typically through an intermolecular covalent reaction which binds the now fluorescent compound to a target molecule. IUPAC uses a broader definition of fluorogenic, wherein an enhancement of fluorescence via a chemical reaction is not required, however in contrast to the IUPAC definition common use of fluorogenic does not refer to non-reaction effects like the enhancement of fluorescence from a fluorophore being in different solvents. Fluorogenic labeling reagents are often used in analytical chemistry procedures, particularly in HPLC or CE to derivative target compounds (e.g. labeling the primary amines of polypeptides), thereby allowing enhanced sensitivity through fluorescence based detection.

== Examples ==
- OPA
- Fluorescamine
- FQ
- NBD-F
- 6-AQC
- Epicocconone
- CBQCA

== See also ==
- Colorogenic
