= D. amseli =

D. amseli may refer to:

- Dasylobus amseli, a harvestman in the family Phalangiidae
- Digitivalva amseli, a moth found in Afghanistan
