= Digitivalva heringi =

Scientific classification
- Kingdom: Animalia
- Phylum: Arthropoda
- Clade: Pancrustacea
- Class: Insecta
- Order: Lepidoptera
- Family: Acrolepiidae
- Genus: Digitivalva
- Species: D. heringi

Binomial name
- Digitivalva heringi (Klimesch, 1956)

Synonyms
- Acrolepia heringi Klimesch, 1956

Species of moth

Digitivalva heringi is a moth of the family Glyphipterigidae. Some sources consider it a synonym of Digitivalva eglanteriella. It is found in the Republic of Macedonia (type locality: Matka Canyon), Croatia, Bulgaria, and Greece. It is named for Erich Martin Hering.

The wingspan is 11–12 mm (0.43–0.47 in). The larvae feed on Pentanema aschersonianum (Asteraceae; formerly Inula aschersoniana). They mine the leaves of their host plant. They can be found at the end of May.
