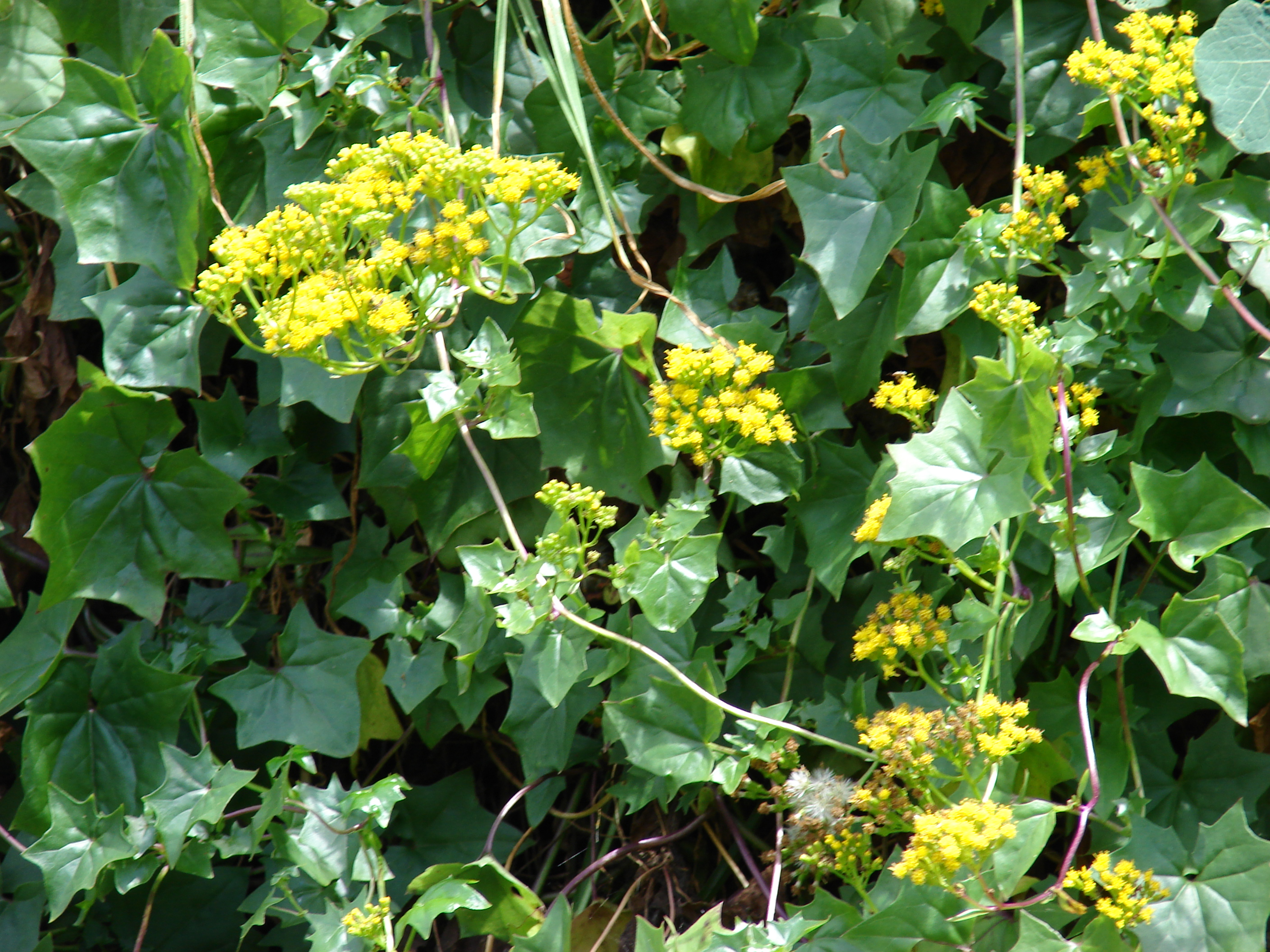

Scientific classification
- Kingdom: Plantae
- Clade: Tracheophytes
- Clade: Angiosperms
- Clade: Eudicots
- Clade: Asterids
- Order: Asterales
- Family: Asteraceae
- Subfamily: Asteroideae
- Tribe: Senecioneae
- Genus: Delairea
- Species: D. odorata

Binomial name
- Delairea odorata Lem.

Synonyms
- Delairea scandens Lem.; Senecio mikanioides Otto ex Walp.; Senecio scandens Juss. ex DC.

= Delairea odorata =

Species of vine in the daisy family

Delairea odorata is a climber within the family Asteraceae that is native to South Africa. One of the two species in the genus Delairea (the other being Delairea aparadensis), it was previously included in the genus Senecio as Senecio mikanioides. It is known as Cape ivy in some parts of the world (US) and German ivy in others (Britain, Ireland). Other names include parlor ivy and Italian ivy.

It is a twining perennial, herbaceous plant that grows 3 metres (9.8 ft) tall. Its multi-lobed leaves somewhat resemble those of the unrelated English ivy. Originally used as an ornamental plant on trellises and as groundcover, it is now rarely cultivated because of its invasiveness, in addition to being a weed. Although it resembles Senecio tamoides, Open Tree of Life indicates that it is most closely related to species in the genus Curio, followed by Senecio angulatus.

== Description ==
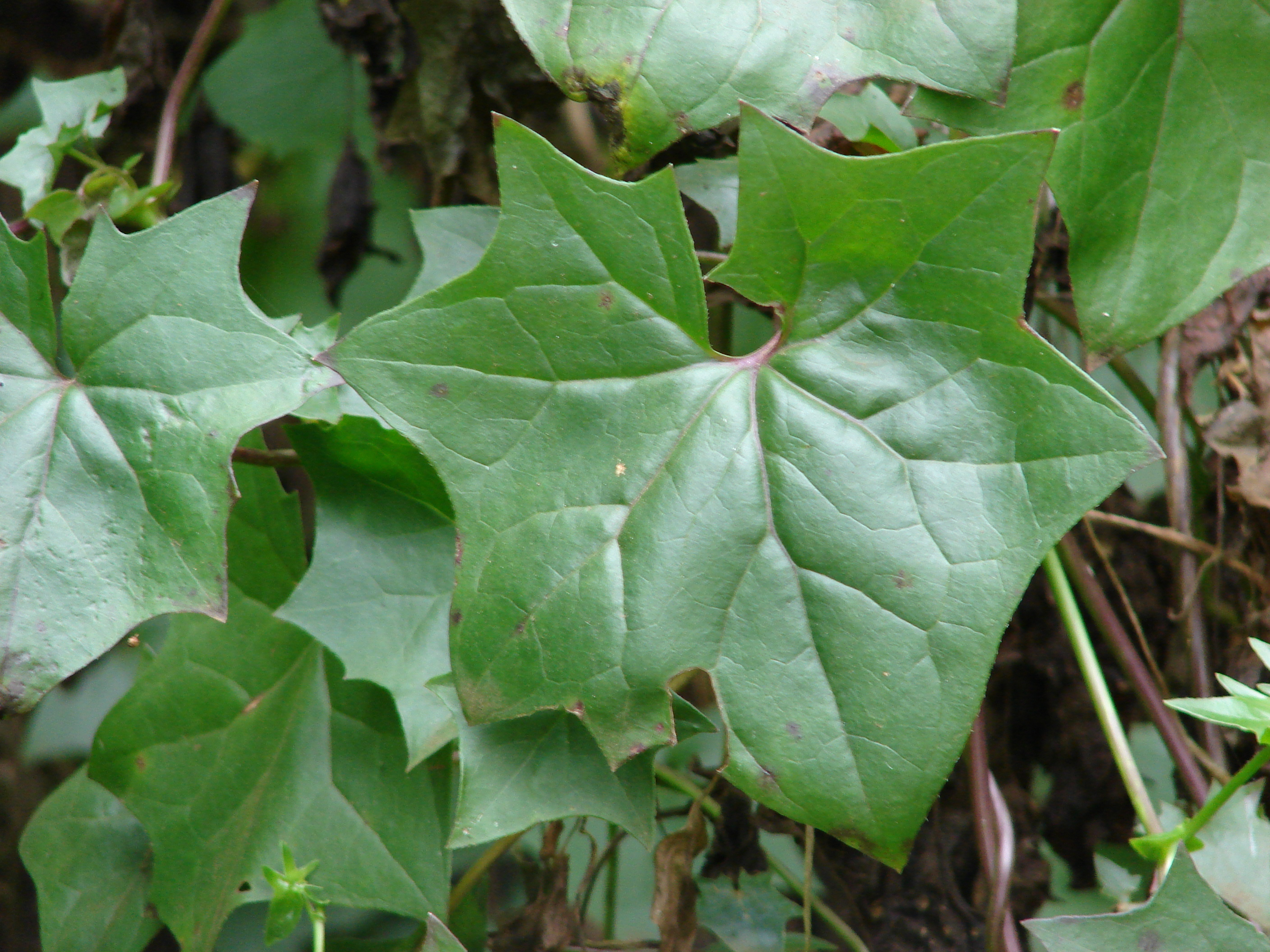
Leaf detail

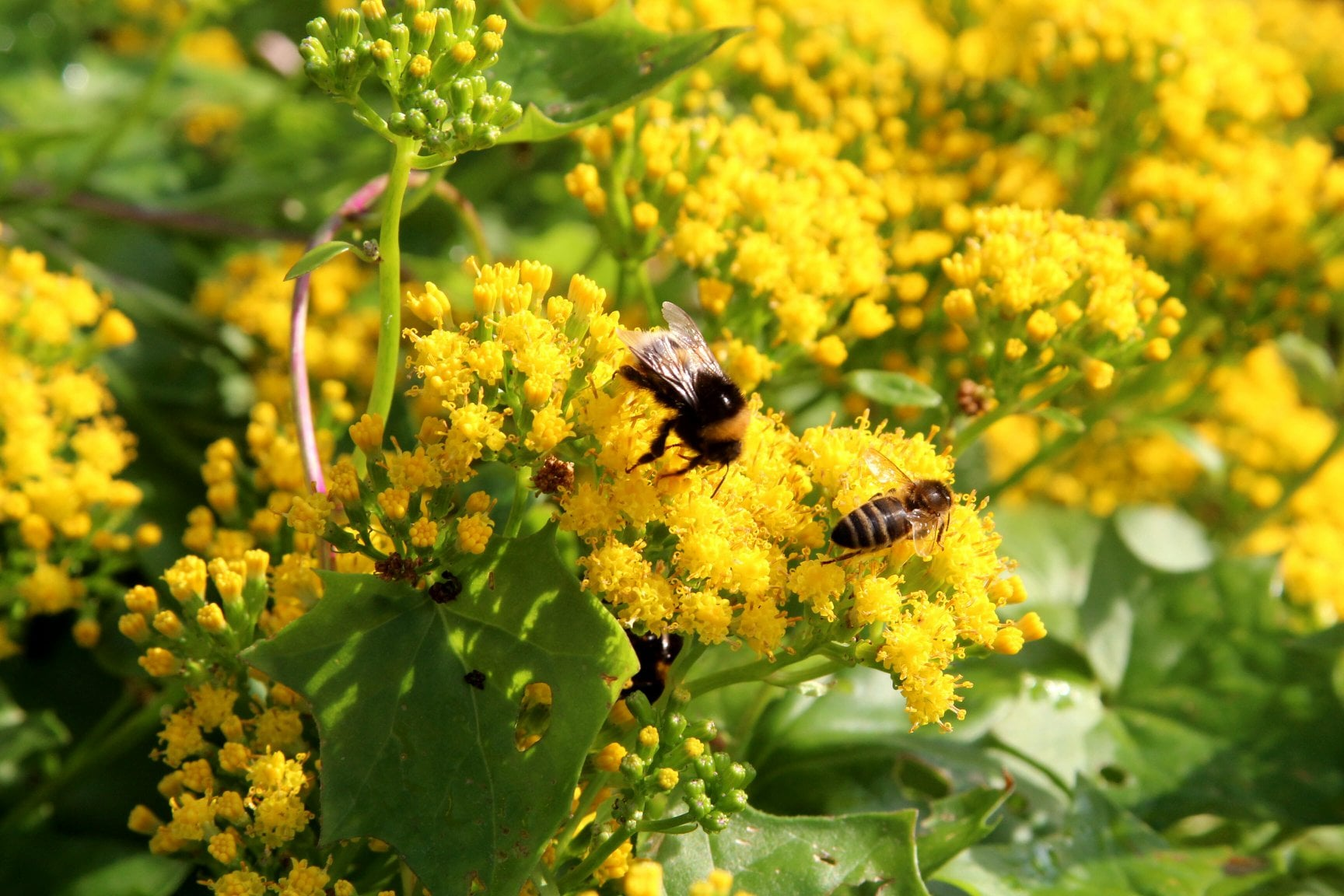
Blooms pollinated by bees

Delairea odorata is a fast-growing vine that can climb to heights of 2–4 metres (7–13 ft).

The glossy and semi-succulent leaves, which are 3–10 centimetres (1 1/4–4 in) long and 3–8 centimetres (1 1/4–3 1/4 in) wide, are alternately arranged along the stems. They have 3–10 rather broad lobes. The upper leaf surface is light green, usually with a somewhat purple cast, while the reverse is somewhat silvery.

The plant's stems and leaves will die between late summer and early autumn, being superseded by new shoots that employ the old stems as climbing support.

=== Inflorescence ===
Its sweet-scented discoid flowers are yellow, and lack the petal-like ray florets found in typical daisies. They have tiny tubular florets surrounded by an involucre of 8-10 small green phyllaries (3–5 millimetres (15/128–25/128 in) long). Flower-heads (2–7 millimetres (5/64–35/128 in) across and 2–5 millimetres (5/64–25/128 in) long) occur in compact clusters at the ends of the branches (terminal corymbs), with clusters consisting of about 15-50 flower-heads. Flowering occurs mostly during winter to early spring. More broadly, it can flower from as early as autumn through to early spring.

The seeds (or achenes) are approximately 2 millimetres (5/64 in) long and are reddish-brown in colour, with a pappus of silky white hairs that is 5–6 millimetres (25/128–15/64 in) long. Most of its seed in North America and possibly elsewhere is unviable, which may be due to a lack of effective pollinators. However, the plant readily reproduce from stem fragments, stolons, or rhizomes as small as 2.5 centimetres (63/64 in).

== Habitat and distribution ==
This plant is somewhat scarce in its native country of South Africa, where it was originally found in the Drakensberg Mountains, on forest edges, at elevations above 1,500 metres (4,900 ft), in moist areas. Its presence in coastal areas (some of which are arid) in South Africa is probably more recent. In California, it is generally found in the coastal fog belt, with a few specimens found inland, particularly in subtropical riparian sites that feature permanent moisture.

It is found in wetter, more temperate regions, but it may still be found in cooler subtropical environments, despite being frost tender. It prefers partial shade, but can withstand heavy shade. In cooler, damper areas, it can prosper in full sun. Despite its invasive nature, the plant is grown as an ornamental houseplant for its foliage. Its active growth is from early autumn to late spring, with a dormant period in summer.

=== Ecological impact ===
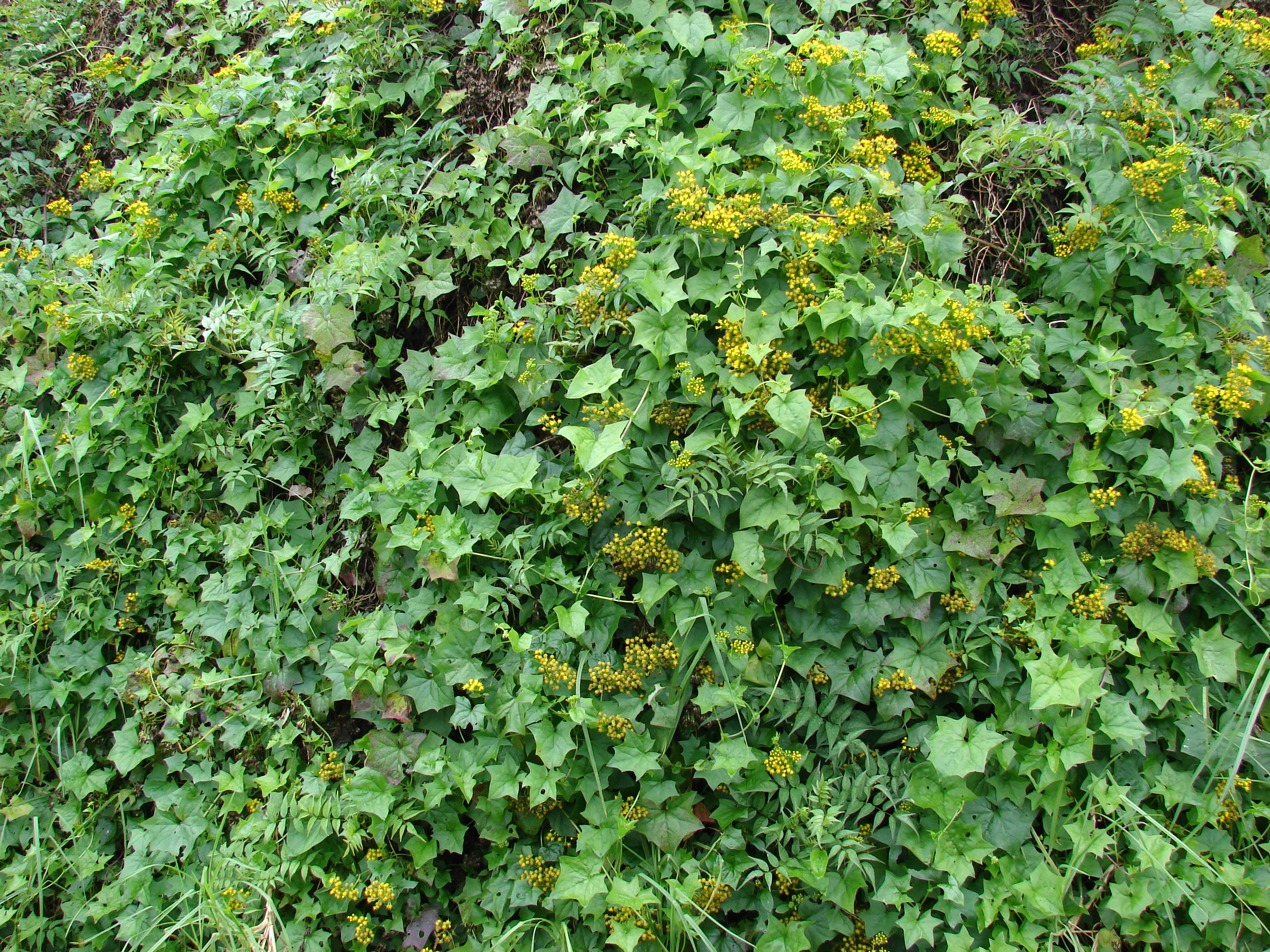
Covering native woodland in Hawaii

D. odorata has been an invasive species in coastal California since 1892, Hawaii, coastal Oregon, New Zealand and southern Australia (particularly in Victoria). The plant will cover shrubs and trees, inhibiting growth, and will also cover ground intensively over a wide area, thereby impeding the germination and growth of native seeds. It is toxic to animals who eat it and to fish, where it trails into waterways.

D. odorata reaches reproductive maturity in two years, and can produce over 30,000 seeds annually. In Hawaii, a purposely-introduced species of arctiinid moth (Galtara extensa), for the biological control of Senecio madagascariensis – both species originally from Madagascar – proved to feed also on D. odorata.

D. odorata is the host of the ascomycete leaf spot fungus Cercospora delaireae, a species nova first described in 2013. It is presently known only from the same South African native range as its host. Due to the pathogen's effects – especially its leaf spot damage – C. delaireae is proposed as a potential biocontrol for D. odorata in its invasive ranges.

Another organism from D. odorata's native range, the acrolepiid moth Digitivalva delaireae, can also be used as a biocontrol for D. odorata. Mehelis et al., 2015 test its food preferences and find it is very selective for D. odorata. Because it avoids any vulnerable native plants in California and Oregon it is a good choice specifically to control the infestations there.

A report originating in California has claimed that, after walking through a thicket of Cape ivy in full bloom at his ranch, a man became lightheaded, fainted and had a seizure. Prior to this event, he had had coughing fits whilst trying to eradicate the plant, which had not been in flower at the time.

The European Union has included it in the list of invasive alien species of Union concern and hence it cannot be imported, bred, transported, commercialized, or intentionally released into the environment in any of its member states.

== Cultivation ==
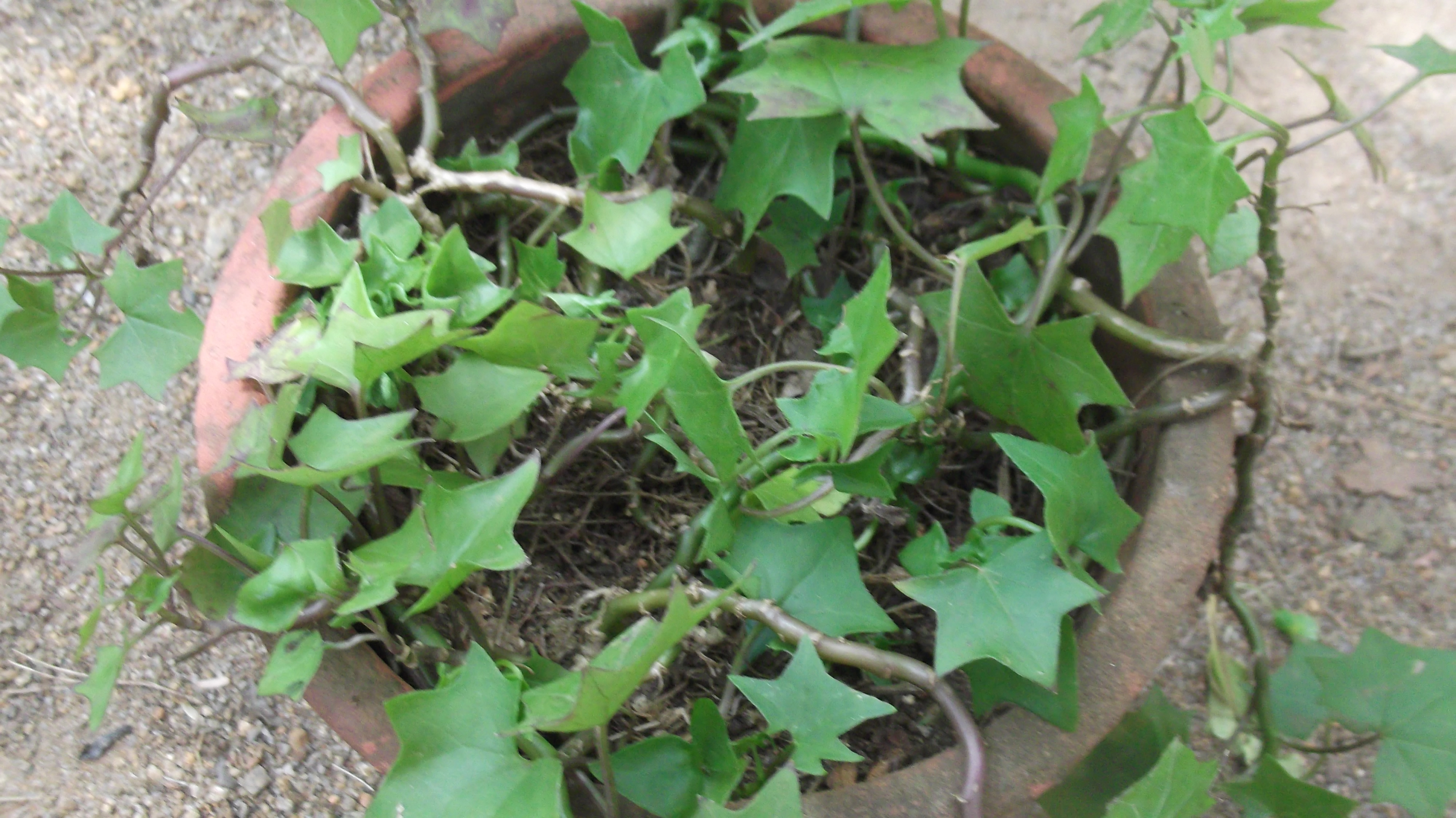
Cultivated as a pot plant in India

Germany ivy is grown as a vine or groundcover, where it can vigorously climb up posts, hedges, trees and shrubs, fences, banks, and walls. The plant is cultivated in landscaping for its ivy-like leaves and scented flowers in bright light or light shade away from abundant sunlight. Propagation is done by cuttings as its stems root readily both in water and soil, without the need for a rooting hormone. Pruning is encouraged for a bushy and compact growth.

Although it can tolerate drought, it thrives better in moist soils, but it cannot withstand soggy soils. When overwatered, its leaves turn brown and have curled edges. Conversely, underwatering will cause its leaves to fall. The plant flourishes in moister winter months and particularly after rainfalls where it displays bright green foliage. During the dry months it may die back to its stems or maintain a minimal growth. Pests include mealy bugs and aphids, and diseases include leaf spot and root rot.

=== History ===
The plant was introduced to the United States in the 19th century as a Victorian era-style houseplant. In the 1850s, in Geelong, the plant was described in the Geelong Advertiser, "the great stumps, over which the little boys played leap-frog, are either gone or covered with the Cape ivy". Furthermore, 1856 and 1864 columns in the Sydney Morning Herald mention a Cape Ivy observed on the dunes at Newcastle, New South Wales and Gulaga. In 1909, it was introduced as an ornamental to Kailua-Kona, Hawaii. Neal (1965) described the plant as, "both a weed and an ornamental."

Today it is no longer a fashionable garden plant and is a garden escape, though it may still be found in old gardens.

== Similar species ==
German ivy is very similar to Senecio angulatus, Senecio tamoides and Senecio macroglossus. A feature that distinguishes this plant from Senecio angulatus and S. tamoides are the small ear-shaped appendages at the base of the stalks of the leaves and its pompom-like flowers which do not have obvious 'petals', whereas S. angulatus and S. tamoides have daisy-like flowers. Atlas of Living Australia has misapplied S. tamoides for its D. odorata observations in Australia.

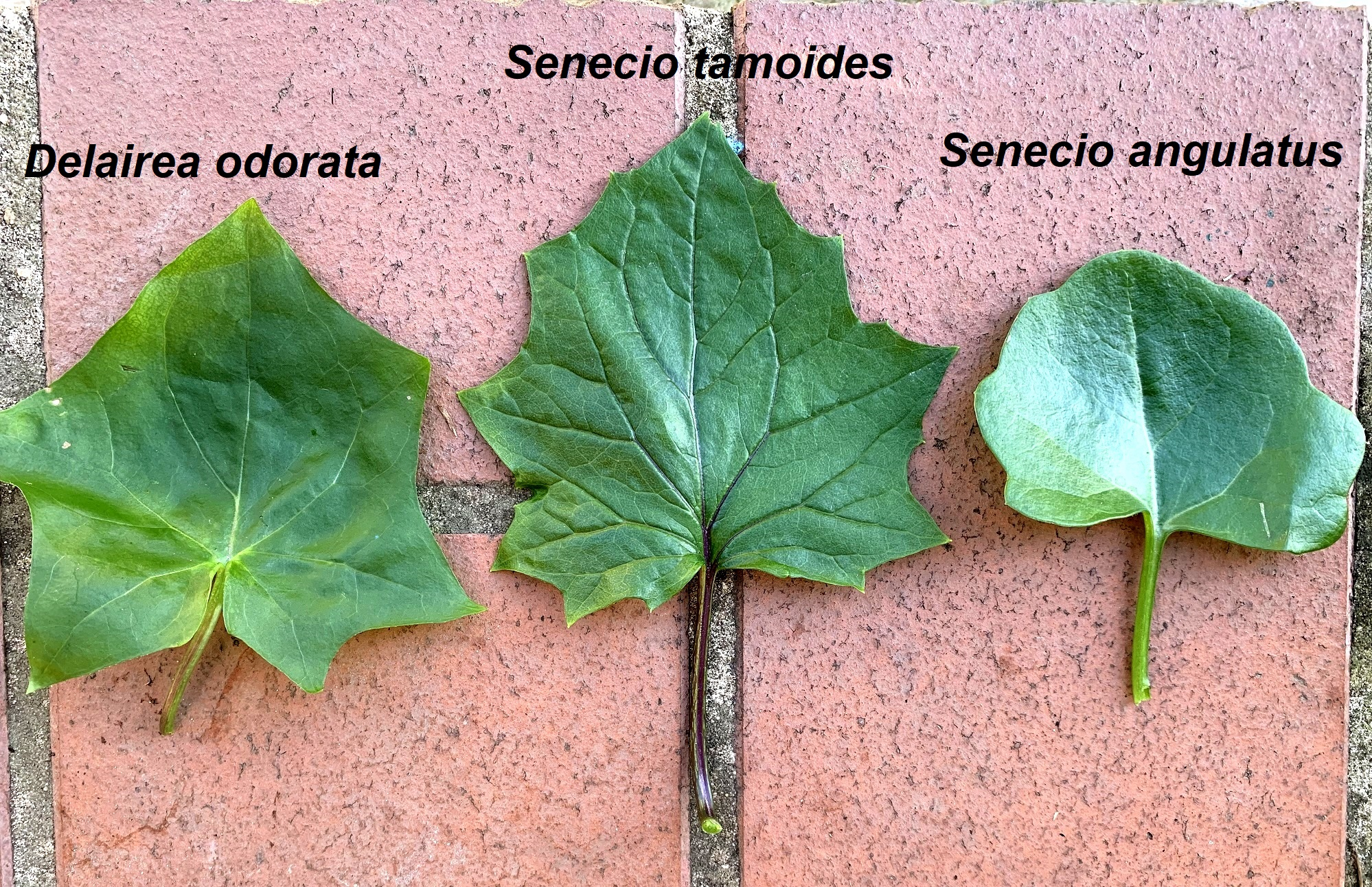
Leaf comparison of S. angulatus, D. odorata and S. tamoides

== Gallery ==
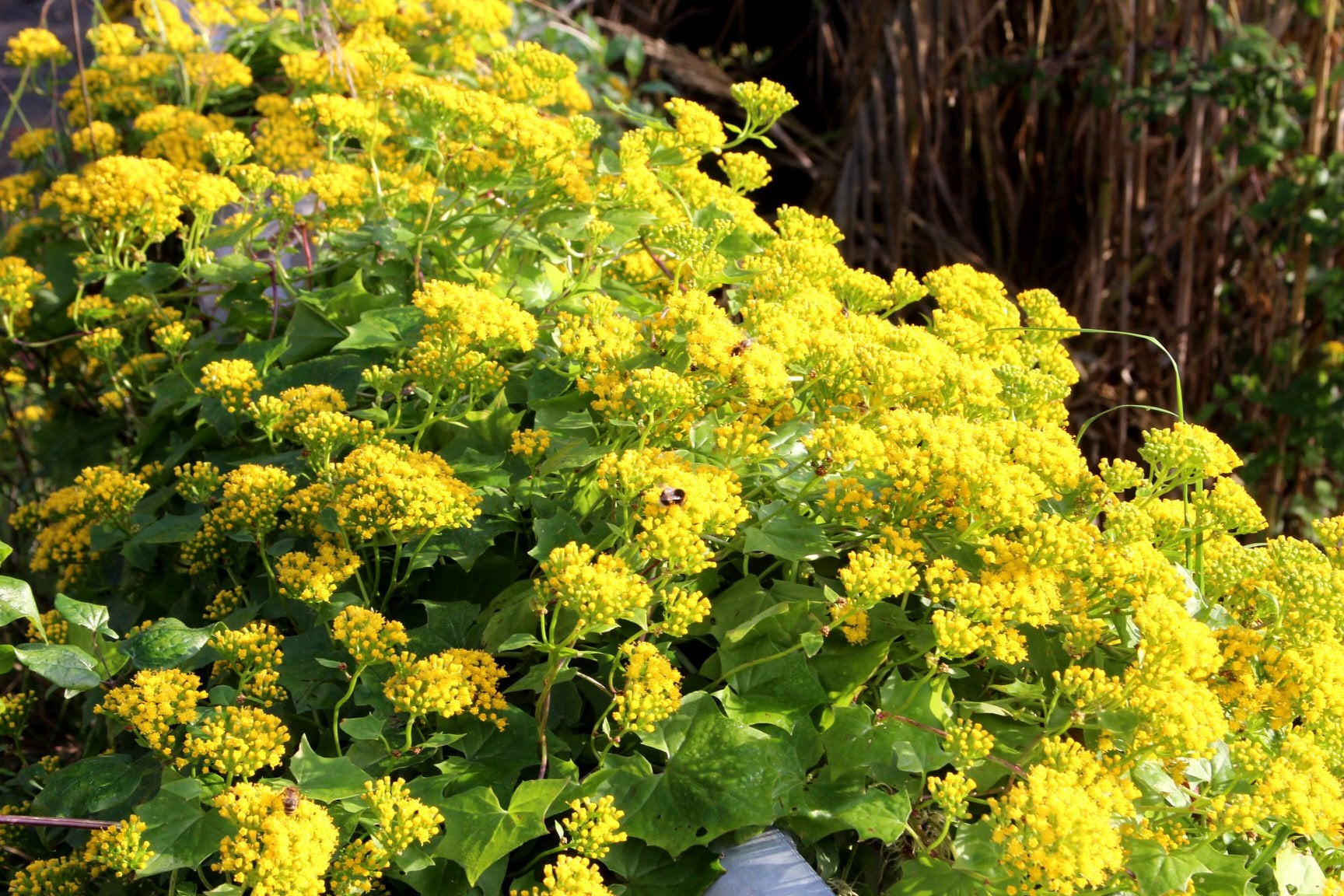

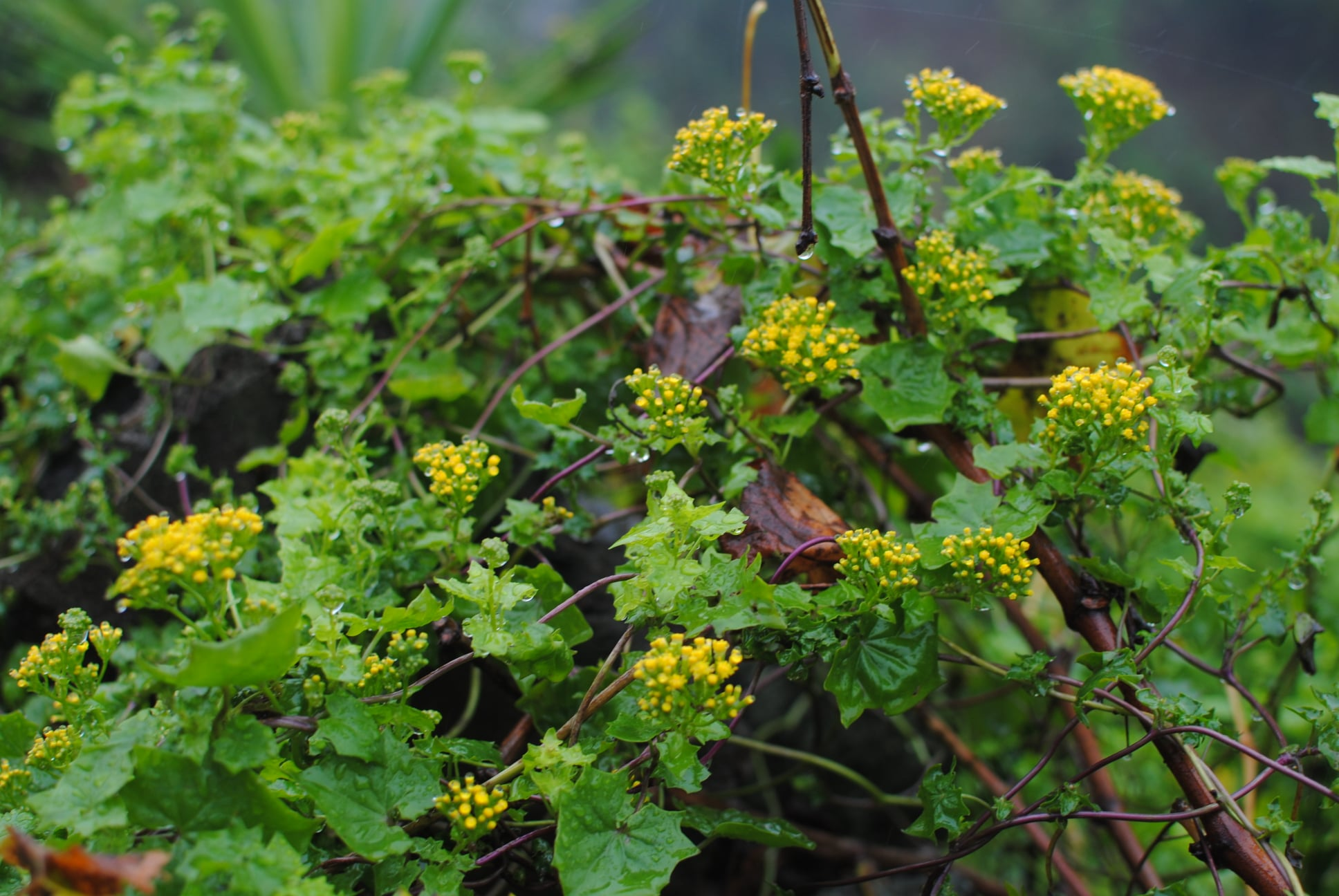

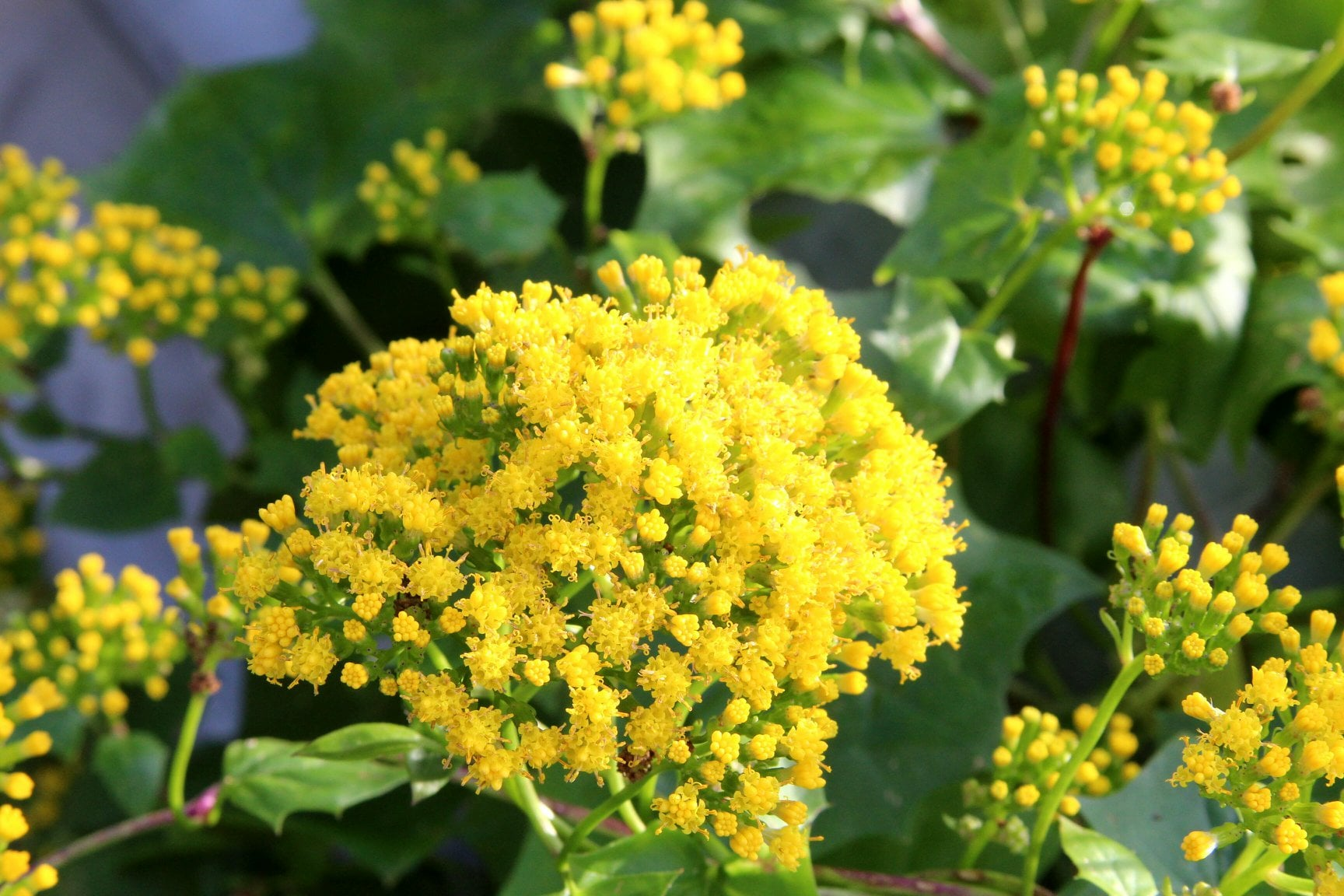

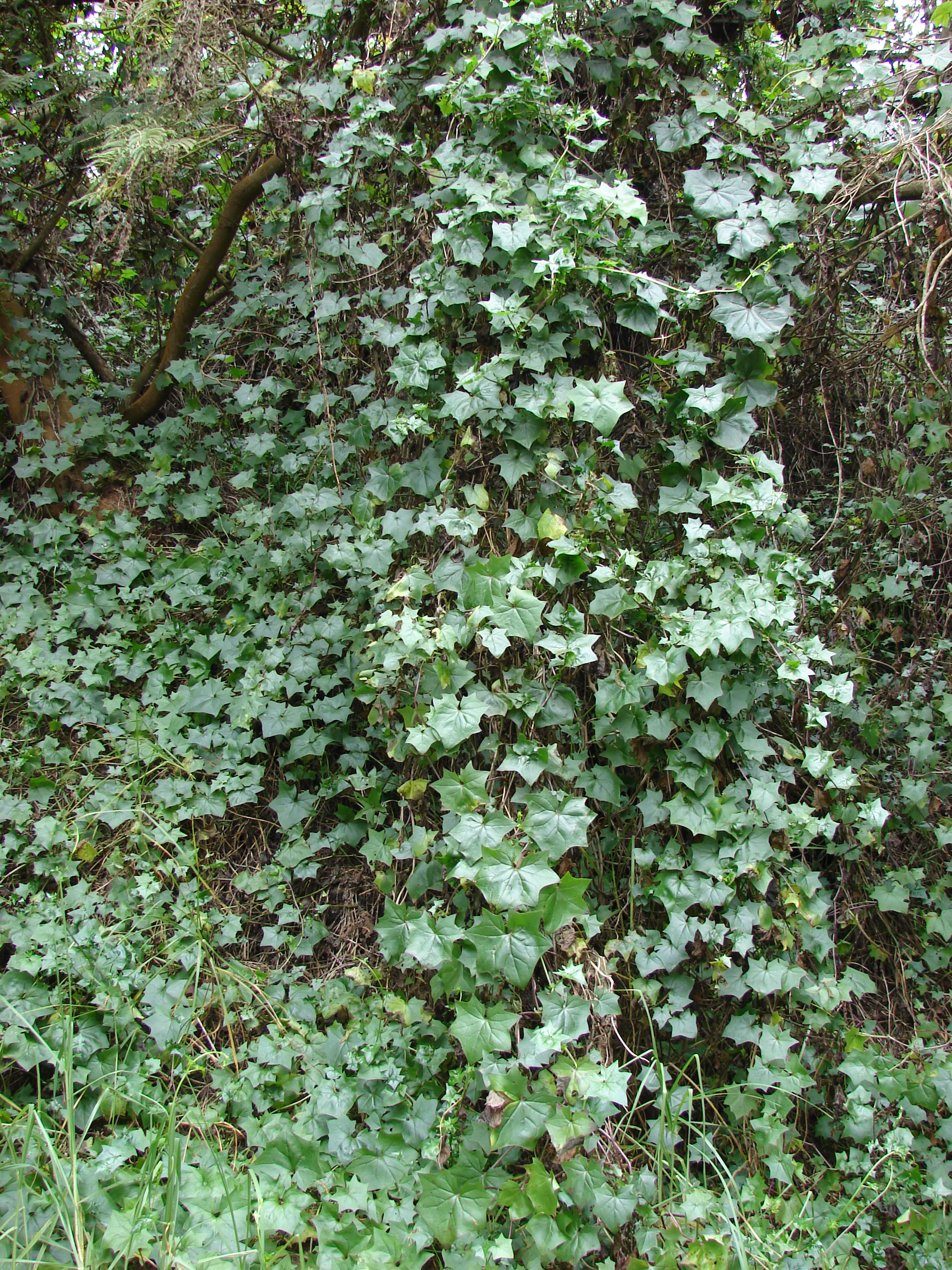
Hawaii

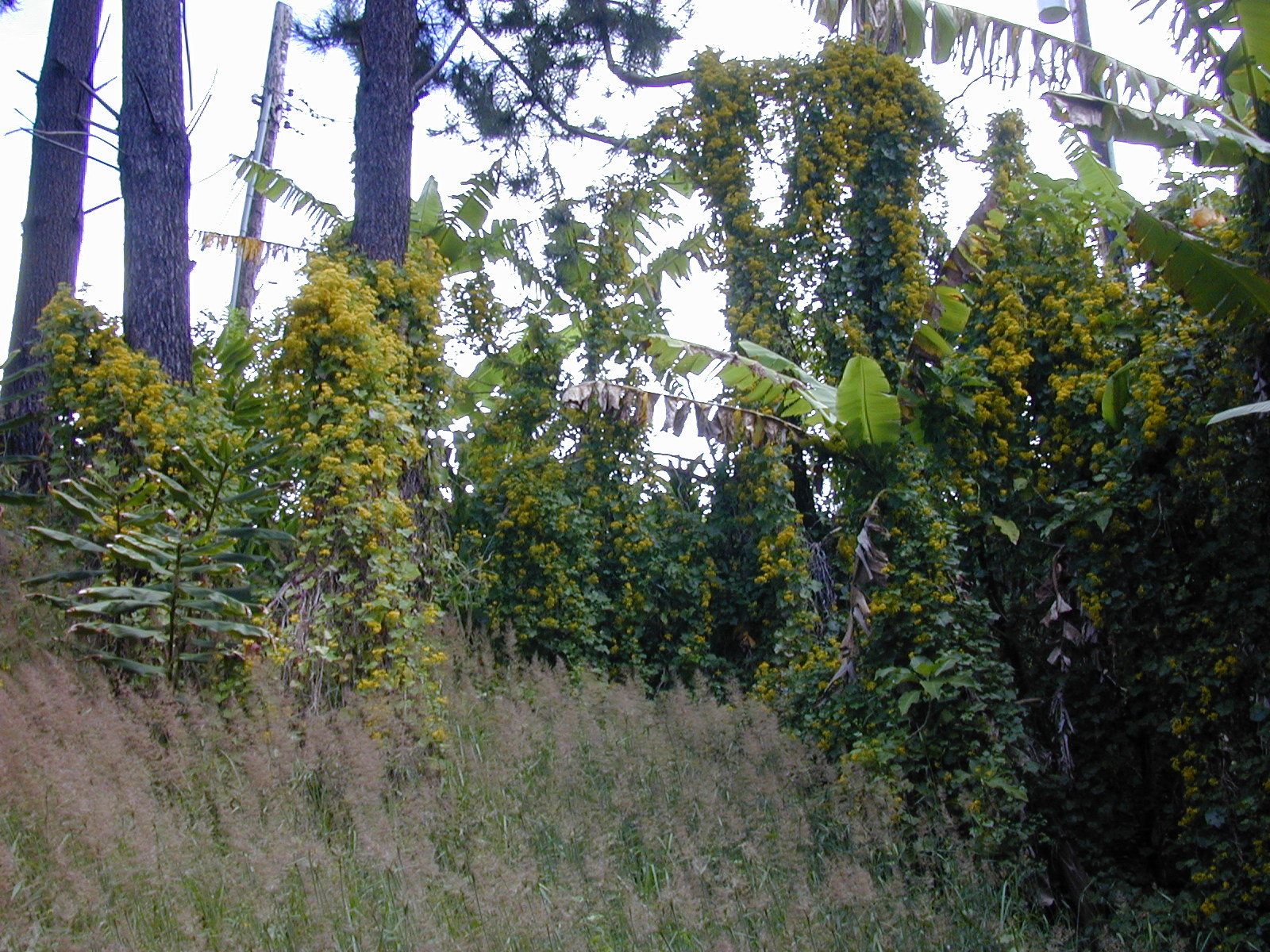

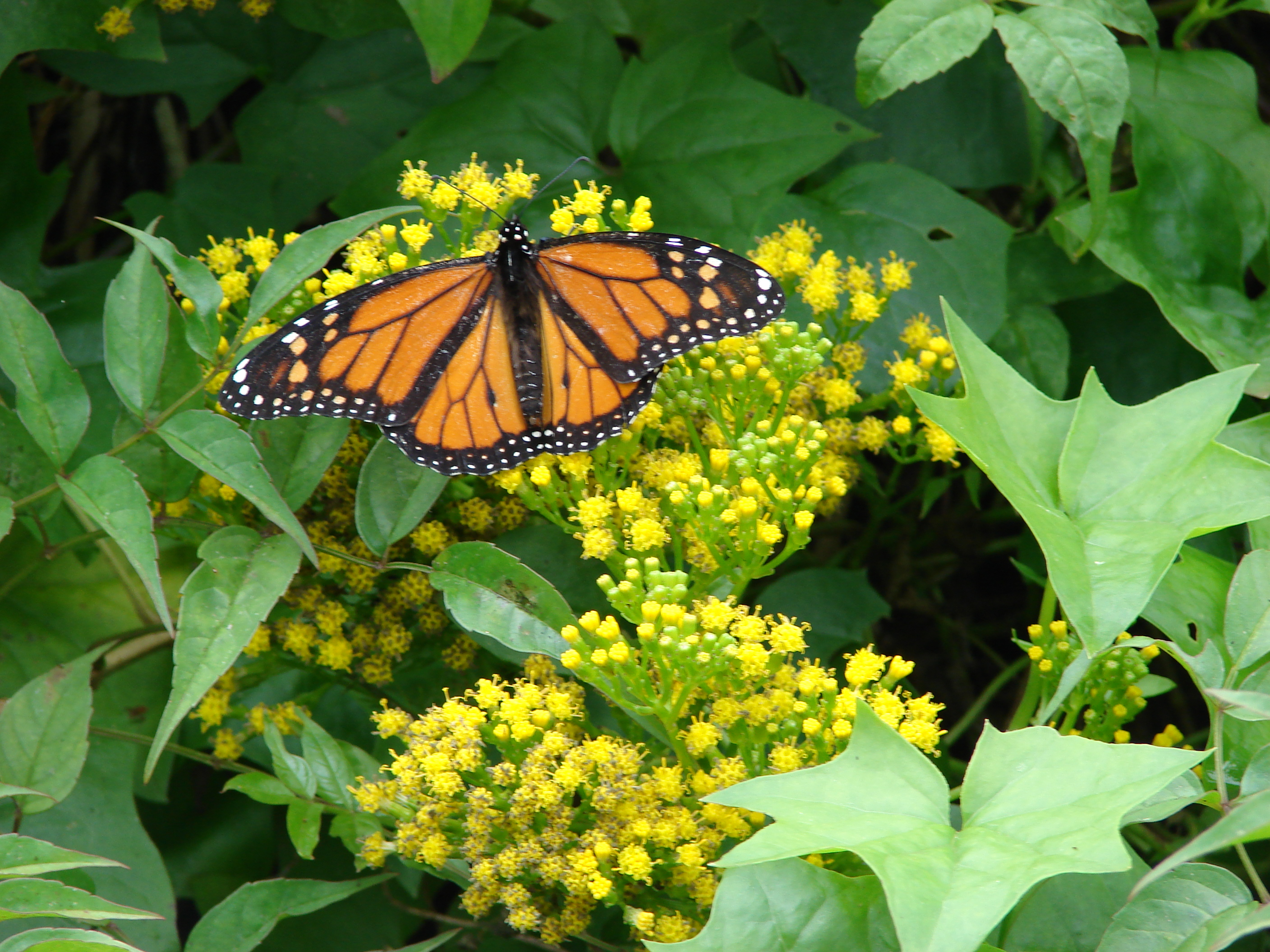
Monarch butterfly

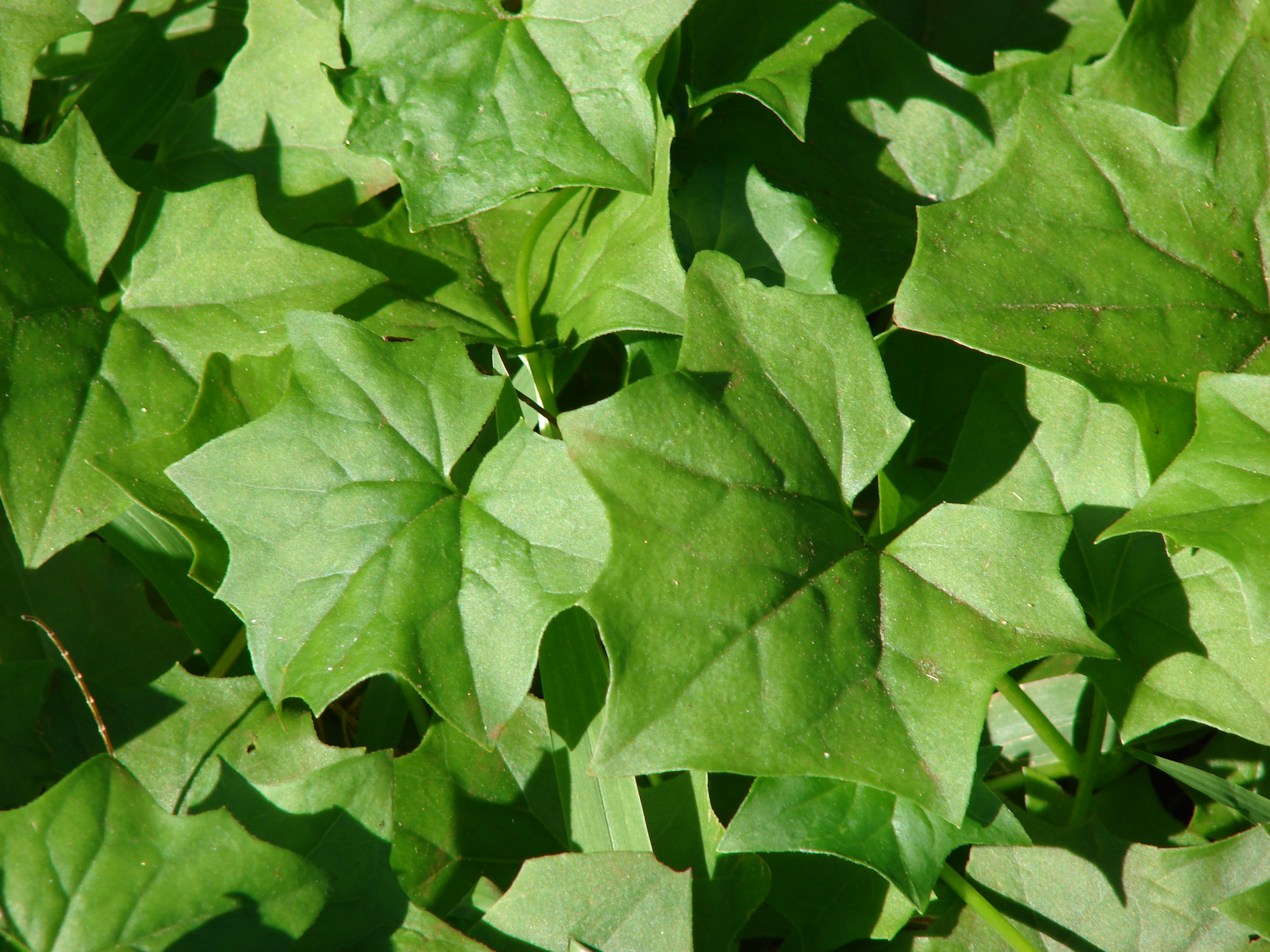
Leaf closeup

== Bibliography ==
- Crockett, James (1972). Foliage House Plants. New York, NY: Time-Life Books. pp. 142–143. ISBN 9780809411214.
- Nelson, Dave (1999). "Invasive Exotic Cape Ivy".
- Greater Wellington Regional Council, New Zealand. "Greater Wellington - German ivy (Senecio mikanioides)". Archived from the original on October 15, 2008.
- Greater Wellington Regional Council, New Zealand. "Greater Wellington - Cape ivy (Senecio angulatus)". Archived from the original on October 15, 2008.
