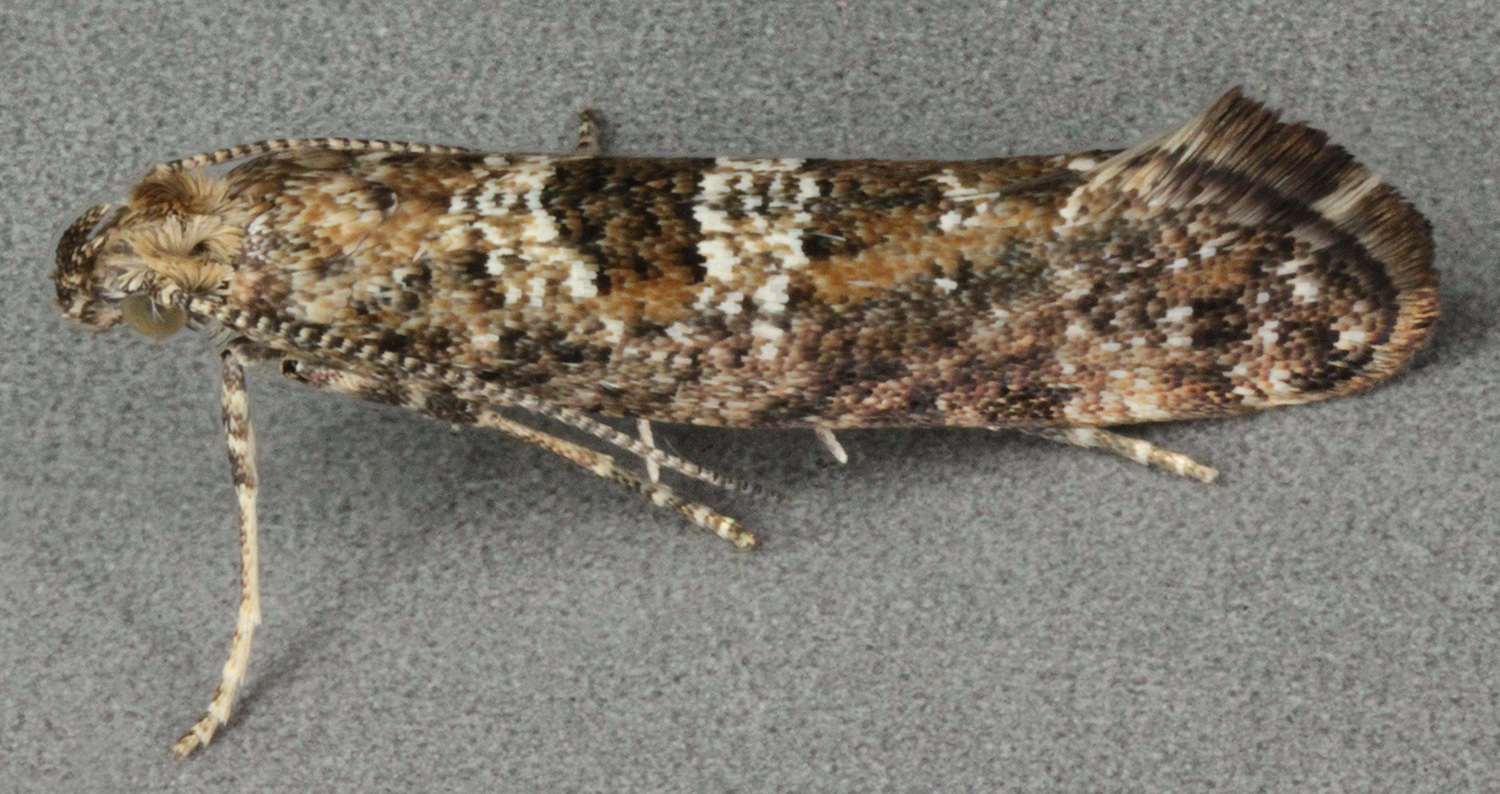

Scientific classification
- Kingdom: Animalia
- Phylum: Arthropoda
- Clade: Pancrustacea
- Class: Insecta
- Order: Lepidoptera
- Family: Acrolepiidae
- Genus: Digitivalva
- Species: D. pulicariae

Binomial name
- Digitivalva pulicariae (Klimesch, 1956)

Synonyms
- Acrolepia pulicariae Klimesch, 1956; Inuliphila pulicariae; Digitivalva granitella sensu auctt. nec (Treitschke, 1833)

= Digitivalva pulicariae =

Species of moth

Digitivalva pulicariae is a moth of the family Acrolepiidae. It is found in most of Europe, except Portugal, Fennoscandia, the Baltic region and Poland.

The wingspan is about 13 mm. Forewings more elongate, grey or fuscous, becoming ochreous-brown towards dorsum, more or less strigulated with blackish; several darker spots on costa posteriorly; a dark fuscous dorsal spot at 4, preceded and followed by whitish spots; one or two whitish dorsal dots towards tornus. Hindwings grey. Larva pale yellow-green; dorsal line darker.

Adults are on wing from August to, after overwintering, May of the following year.

The larvae feed on Pulicaria dysenterica. They mine the leaves of their host plant. The larvae are yellowish green with a brown head. They can be found from June to July.
