= Digitivalva orientella =

Scientific classification
- Kingdom: Animalia
- Phylum: Arthropoda
- Clade: Pancrustacea
- Class: Insecta
- Order: Lepidoptera
- Family: Acrolepiidae
- Genus: Digitivalva
- Species: D. orientella

Binomial name
- Digitivalva orientella (Klimesch, 1956)

Synonyms
- Acrolepia orientella Klimesch, 1956; Inuliphila orientella; Digitivalva falkneri Amsel, 1974; Acrolepia falkneri; Digitivalva glaseri Gaedike, 1971; Acrolepia glaseri

Species of moth

Digitivalva orientella is a moth of the family Acrolepiidae. It is found in Slovenia, Croatia, Romania, the Republic of Macedonia, Ukraine and Russia. It has also been recorded from Turkey.

The larvae feed on Inula species. They mine the leaves of their host plant.
