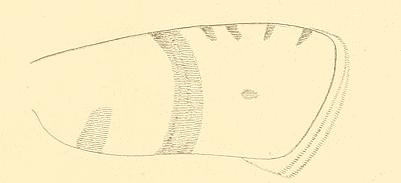
- Wing

Scientific classification
- Domain: Eukaryota
- Kingdom: Animalia
- Phylum: Arthropoda
- Class: Insecta
- Order: Lepidoptera
- Family: Acrolepiidae
- Genus: Digitivalva
- Species: D. arnicella

Binomial name
- Digitivalva arnicella (Heyden, 1863)

Synonyms
- Acrolepia arnicella Heyden, 1863; Acrolepia adjectella Heyden, 1863

= Digitivalva arnicella =

Species of moth

Digitivalva arnicella is a moth of the family Acrolepiidae. It is found in Norway, Sweden, the Netherlands, Belgium, Denmark, Germany, France, Switzerland, Austria, Italy, Hungary, Slovakia, the Czech Republic, Romania, Poland and Lithuania.

The wingspan is 11–13 mm (0.43–0.51 in). Adults are on wing in May.

The larvae feed on Arnica montana. They mine the leaves of their host plant. The larvae are white. They can be found from autumn to May.
