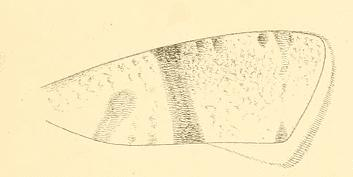
- Wing

Scientific classification
- Kingdom: Animalia
- Phylum: Arthropoda
- Class: Insecta
- Order: Lepidoptera
- Family: Acrolepiidae
- Genus: Digitivalva
- Species: D. valeriella

Binomial name
- Digitivalva valeriella (Snellen, 1878)

Synonyms
- Acrolepia valeriella Snellen, 1878; Acrolepia volgensis Toll, 1958

= Digitivalva valeriella =

Species of moth

Digitivalva valeriella is a moth of the family Acrolepiidae. It is found in Sweden, Denmark, Germany, France, Austria, Hungary, Romania, Slovakia, Poland, Lithuania, Latvia and Russia.

The wingspan is 10–12 mm.

The larvae feed on Inula britannica. They mine the leaves of their host plant. Larvae can be found from October to May and again from July to August.
