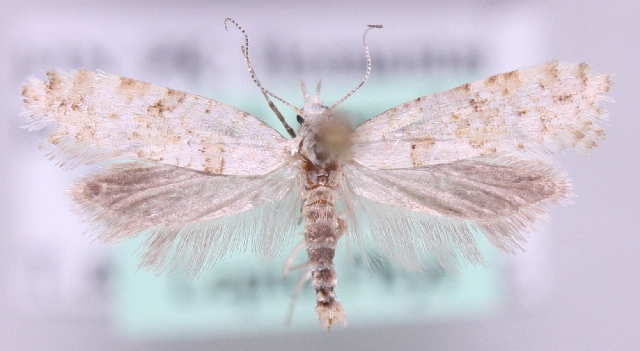

Scientific classification
- Kingdom: Animalia
- Phylum: Arthropoda
- Clade: Pancrustacea
- Class: Insecta
- Order: Lepidoptera
- Family: Acrolepiidae
- Genus: Digitivalva
- Species: D. reticulella

Binomial name
- Digitivalva reticulella (Hubner, 1796)

Synonyms
- Tinea reticulella Hubner, 1796; Acrolepia reticulella; Lita cariosella Treitschke, 1835; Acrolepia cariosella

= Digitivalva reticulella =

Species of moth

Digitivalva reticulella is a moth of the family Acrolepiidae found in most of Europe, except Ireland, Great Britain, the Netherlands, France, Portugal, Slovenia, much of the Balkan Peninsula, and Lithuania.

The wingspan is 11–13 mm.

The larvae feed on Filago, Gnaphalium luteoalbum, Helichrysum arenarium, Logfia arvensis, and Omalotheca sylvatica. They mine the leaves of their host plants. Larvae have a yellow body and a brown head. They can be found from March to April.
