= Digitivalva nephelota =

Scientific classification
- Kingdom: Animalia
- Phylum: Arthropoda
- Class: Insecta
- Order: Lepidoptera
- Family: Acrolepiidae
- Genus: Digitivalva
- Species: D. nephelota

Binomial name
- Digitivalva nephelota (Bradley, 1965)

Synonyms
- Acrolepia nephelota Bradley, 1965

Species of moth

Digitivalva nephelota is a moth of the family Acrolepiidae. It is found in Uganda.
