= Digitivalva christophi =

Scientific classification
- Domain: Eukaryota
- Kingdom: Animalia
- Phylum: Arthropoda
- Class: Insecta
- Order: Lepidoptera
- Family: Acrolepiidae
- Genus: Digitivalva
- Species: D. christophi

Binomial name
- Digitivalva christophi (Toll, 1958)

Synonyms
- Acrolepia christophi Toll, 1958; Inuliphila christophi

Species of moth

Digitivalva christophi is a moth of the family Acrolepiidae. It is found in Ukraine and Russia.
