= Digitivalva asiatica =

Scientific classification
- Kingdom: Animalia
- Phylum: Arthropoda
- Clade: Pancrustacea
- Class: Insecta
- Order: Lepidoptera
- Family: Acrolepiidae
- Genus: Digitivalva
- Species: D. asiatica

Binomial name
- Digitivalva asiatica Gaedike, 1971

Species of moth

Digitivalva asiatica is a moth of the family Acrolepiidae. It is found in China (Shaanxi, Yunnan).
