= Digitivalva wolfschlaegeri =

Scientific classification
- Kingdom: Animalia
- Phylum: Arthropoda
- Clade: Pancrustacea
- Class: Insecta
- Order: Lepidoptera
- Family: Acrolepiidae
- Genus: Digitivalva
- Species: D. wolfschlaegeri

Binomial name
- Digitivalva wolfschlaegeri (Klimesch, 1956)

Synonyms
- Acrolepia wolfschlaegeri Klimesch, 1956

Species of moth

Digitivalva wolfschlaegeri is a moth of the family Glyphipterigidae. It is found in the Republic of Macedonia (type locality: Petrina Planina by Lake Ohrid) and Croatia. It is named for Roman Wolfschläger who collected the type material.

The wingspan is 13–14 mm (0.51–0.55 in).
