= Digitivalva delaireae =

Scientific classification
- Kingdom: Animalia
- Phylum: Arthropoda
- Clade: Pancrustacea
- Class: Insecta
- Order: Lepidoptera
- Family: Acrolepiidae
- Genus: Digitivalva
- Species: D. delaireae

Binomial name
- Digitivalva delaireae Gaedike & Krüger, 2002

Species of moth

Digitivalva delaireae is a moth of the family Acrolepiidae that is endemic to South Africa.

It is a potential biological control agent for Delairea odorata, the larval host plant. Mehelis et al., 2015 test the moth's food preferences and find a strong preference for D. odorata and against any vulnerable native plants in California and Oregon, making this a good biocontrol especially for those areas.
