= Digitivalva artemisiella =

Scientific classification
- Kingdom: Animalia
- Phylum: Arthropoda
- Class: Insecta
- Order: Lepidoptera
- Family: Acrolepiidae
- Genus: Digitivalva
- Species: D. artemisiella

Binomial name
- Digitivalva artemisiella Moriuti, 1972

Species of moth

Digitivalva artemisiella is a moth of the family Acrolepiidae. It is found in Japan.

The wingspan is 8–11 mm.
