= Digitivalva solidaginis =

Scientific classification
- Domain: Eukaryota
- Kingdom: Animalia
- Phylum: Arthropoda
- Class: Insecta
- Order: Lepidoptera
- Family: Acrolepiidae
- Genus: Digitivalva
- Species: D. solidaginis

Binomial name
- Digitivalva solidaginis (Staudinger, 1859)

Synonyms
- Acrolepia solidaginis Staudinger, 1859; Inuliphila solidaginis

Species of moth

Digitivalva solidaginis is a moth of the family Acrolepiidae. It is found in France, Spain and Russia.

The larvae feed on Dittrichia viscosa and Solidago virgaurea. They mine the leaves of their host plant. The larvae can be found in June.
