= Digitivalva africana =

Scientific classification
- Kingdom: Animalia
- Phylum: Arthropoda
- Clade: Pancrustacea
- Class: Insecta
- Order: Lepidoptera
- Family: Acrolepiidae
- Genus: Digitivalva
- Species: D. africana

Binomial name
- Digitivalva africana Gaedike, 1988

Species of moth

Digitivalva africana is a moth of the family Acrolepiidae. It is found in Tanzania.
