= Digitivalva luteola =

Scientific classification
- Kingdom: Animalia
- Phylum: Arthropoda
- Clade: Pancrustacea
- Class: Insecta
- Order: Lepidoptera
- Family: Acrolepiidae
- Genus: Digitivalva
- Species: D. luteola

Binomial name
- Digitivalva luteola Gaedike, 1988

Species of moth

Digitivalva luteola is a moth of the family Acrolepiidae. It is found in Tanzania.
