= Digitivalva seligeri =

Scientific classification
- Kingdom: Animalia
- Phylum: Arthropoda
- Clade: Pancrustacea
- Class: Insecta
- Order: Lepidoptera
- Family: Acrolepiidae
- Genus: Digitivalva
- Species: D. seligeri

Binomial name
- Digitivalva seligeri Gaedike, 2011

Species of moth

Digitivalva seligeri is a moth of the family Acrolepiidae. It was described by Reinhard Gaedike in 1975. It is found in Greece (including the Peloponnese, the type location).
