= Digitivalva kasachstanica =

Scientific classification
- Kingdom: Animalia
- Phylum: Arthropoda
- Clade: Pancrustacea
- Class: Insecta
- Order: Lepidoptera
- Family: Acrolepiidae
- Genus: Digitivalva
- Species: D. kasachstanica

Binomial name
- Digitivalva kasachstanica Gaedike, 1994

Species of moth

Digitivalva kasachstanica is a moth of the family Acrolepiidae. It is found in Kazakhstan.
