= Digitivalva occidentella =

Scientific classification
- Kingdom: Animalia
- Phylum: Arthropoda
- Clade: Pancrustacea
- Class: Insecta
- Order: Lepidoptera
- Family: Acrolepiidae
- Genus: Digitivalva
- Species: D. occidentella

Binomial name
- Digitivalva occidentella (Klimesch, 1956)

Synonyms
- Acrolepia occidentella Klimesch, 1956; Inuliphila occidentella

Species of moth

Digitivalva occidentella is a moth of the family Acrolepiidae. It is found in France, Spain, Italy, Croatia, Romania and on Crete. It has also been recorded from Turkey.

The larvae feed on Inula conzyza. They mine the leaves of their host plant. They can be found in April.
