= Digitivalva perlepidella =

Scientific classification
- Kingdom: Animalia
- Phylum: Arthropoda
- Clade: Pancrustacea
- Class: Insecta
- Order: Lepidoptera
- Family: Acrolepiidae
- Genus: Digitivalva
- Species: D. perlepidella

Binomial name
- Digitivalva perlepidella (Stainton, 1849)

Synonyms
- Roeslerstammia perlepidella Stainton, 1849; Acrolepia perlepidella; Roeslerstammia fulviceps Wocke, 1850; Acrolepia fulviceps; Roeslerstammia ruficeps Herrich-Schaffer, 1853; Acrolepia ruficeps

Species of moth

Digitivalva perlepidella is a moth of the family Acrolepiidae. It is found in Great Britain, the Netherlands, France, Germany, Switzerland, Austria, Poland, the Czech Republic, Slovakia, Hungary, Croatia, Romania and Bulgaria.

The wingspan is 10–12 mm. Adults have purplish, orange brown and white markings. They are day-flying and are on wing in May and June.

The larvae feed on Inula conyza. They mine the leaves of their host plant. They can be found from April to May and from July to August.
