= Digitivalva macedonica =

Scientific classification
- Kingdom: Animalia
- Phylum: Arthropoda
- Clade: Pancrustacea
- Class: Insecta
- Order: Lepidoptera
- Family: Acrolepiidae
- Genus: Digitivalva
- Species: D. macedonica

Binomial name
- Digitivalva macedonica (Klimesch, 1956)

Synonyms
- Acrolepia macedonica Klimesch, 1956

Species of moth

Digitivalva macedonica is a moth of the family Glyphipterigidae. It is found in North Macedonia (type locality: Petrina Planina by Lake Ohrid) and Greece.

The wingspan is 14 mm (0.55 in).
