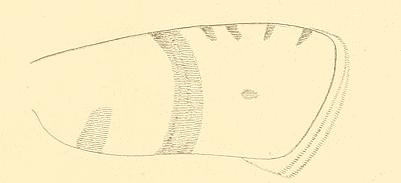

Scientific classification
- Kingdom: Animalia
- Phylum: Arthropoda
- Clade: Pancrustacea
- Class: Insecta
- Order: Lepidoptera
- Family: Acrolepiidae
- Genus: Digitivalva; Gaedike, 1970

Species
- See text

Synonyms
- Inuliphila Gaedike, 1970

= Digitivalva =

Genus of moths

Digitivalva is a genus of moths in the family Acrolepiidae.

== Species ==
The following species are classified:

- Digitivalva africana Gaedike, 1988
- Digitivalva amseli Gaedike, 1975
- Digitivalva arnicella Heyden, 1863
- Digitivalva artemisiella Moriuti, 1972
- Digitivalva asiatica Gaedike, 1971
- Digitivalva christophi (Toll, 1958)
- Digitivalva delaireae Gaedike & Krüger, 2002
- Digitivalva eglanteriella Mann, 1855
- Digitivalva exsuccella (Erschoff, 1874)
- Digitivalva granitella Treitschke, 1833
- Digitivalva hemiglypha Diakonoff & Arita, 1976
- Digitivalva heringi (Klimesch, 1956)
- Digitivalva hoenei Gaedike, 1971
- Digitivalva kasachstanica Gaedike, 1994
- Digitivalva longipennella (Moriuti, 1972)
- Digitivalva luteola Gaedike, 1988
- Digitivalva macedonica Klimesch, 1956
- Digitivalva minima Gibeaux, 1987
- Digitivalva nephelota (Bradley, 1965)
- Digitivalva occidentella Klimesch, 1956
- Digitivalva orientella Klimesch, 1956
- Digitivalva pappella Walsingham, 1907
- Digitivalva perlepidella Stainton, 1849
- Digitivalva peyrierasi Gibeaux, 1987
- Digitivalva pulicariae Klimesch, 1956
- Digitivalva reticulella Hübner, 1796
- Digitivalva seligeri Gaedike, 2011
- Digitivalva solidaginis Staudinger, 1859
- Digitivalva sibirica (Toll, 1958)
- Digitivalva trapezopa (Meyrick, 1914)
- Digitivalva valeriella Snellen, 1878
- Digitivalva viettei Gibeaux, 1987
- Digitivalva wolfschlaegeri Klimesch, 1956
