= Digitivalva viettei =

Scientific classification
- Kingdom: Animalia
- Phylum: Arthropoda
- Clade: Pancrustacea
- Class: Insecta
- Order: Lepidoptera
- Family: Acrolepiidae
- Genus: Digitivalva
- Species: D. viettei

Binomial name
- Digitivalva viettei Gibeaux, 1987

Species of moth

Digitivalva viettei is a moth of the family Acrolepiidae. It is known from Africa.
