= Digitivalva sibirica =

Scientific classification
- Domain: Eukaryota
- Kingdom: Animalia
- Phylum: Arthropoda
- Class: Insecta
- Order: Lepidoptera
- Family: Acrolepiidae
- Genus: Digitivalva
- Species: D. sibirica

Binomial name
- Digitivalva sibirica (Toll, 1958)

Synonyms
- Acrolepia sibirica Toll, 1958; Digitivalva moriutii Gaedike, 1982; Acrolepia moriutii

Species of moth

Digitivalva sibirica is a moth of the family Acrolepiidae. It is found in China (Guizhou, Yunnan), Russia (Primorskiy kray, Khabarovskaya oblast, Amurskaya oblast, Yuzhniye Kurili), Korea and Japan (Honshu).
