= Digitivalva exsuccella =

Scientific classification
- Domain: Eukaryota
- Kingdom: Animalia
- Phylum: Arthropoda
- Class: Insecta
- Order: Lepidoptera
- Family: Acrolepiidae
- Genus: Digitivalva
- Species: D. exsuccella

Binomial name
- Digitivalva exsuccella (Erschoff, 1874)

Synonyms
- Acrolepia exsuccella Erschoff, 1874

Species of moth

Digitivalva exsuccella is a moth of the family Acrolepiidae. It was described by Nikolay Grigoryevich Erschoff in 1874. It was described from Uzbekistan.
