= Digitivalva trapezopa =

Scientific classification
- Kingdom: Animalia
- Phylum: Arthropoda
- Class: Insecta
- Order: Lepidoptera
- Family: Acrolepiidae
- Genus: Digitivalva
- Species: D. trapezopa

Binomial name
- Digitivalva trapezopa (Meyrick, 1914)

Synonyms
- Acrolepia trapezopa Meyrick, 1914

Species of moth

Digitivalva trapezopa is a moth of the family Acrolepiidae. It is known from South Africa.
