= Digitivalva longipennella =

Scientific classification
- Kingdom: Animalia
- Phylum: Arthropoda
- Class: Insecta
- Order: Lepidoptera
- Family: Acrolepiidae
- Genus: Digitivalva
- Species: D. longipennella

Binomial name
- Digitivalva longipennella Moriuti, 1972

Synonyms
- Acrolepia longipennella; Inuliphila longipennella

Species of moth

Digitivalva longipennella is a moth belonging to the family Acrolepiidae. It is found in Taiwan.
