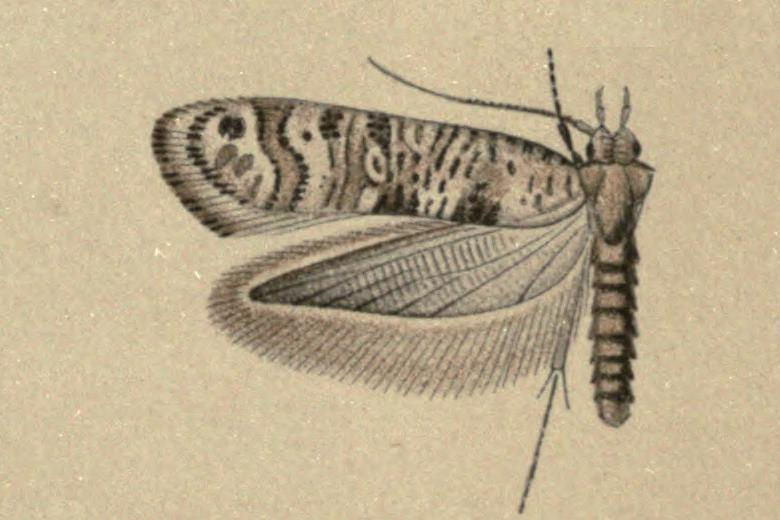

Scientific classification
- Domain: Eukaryota
- Kingdom: Animalia
- Phylum: Arthropoda
- Class: Insecta
- Order: Lepidoptera
- Family: Acrolepiidae
- Genus: Digitivalva
- Species: D. pappella

Binomial name
- Digitivalva pappella (Walsingham, 1908)

Synonyms
- Acrolepia pappella Walsingham, 1908; Buculatrix pappella

= Digitivalva pappella =

Species of moth

Digitivalva pappella is a moth of the family Acrolepiidae. It is found in Spain and on the Canary Islands.

The larvae feed on Allagopappus dichotomus. They mine the leaves of their host plant.
