= Digitivalva hemiglypha =

Scientific classification
- Kingdom: Animalia
- Phylum: Arthropoda
- Clade: Pancrustacea
- Class: Insecta
- Order: Lepidoptera
- Family: Acrolepiidae
- Genus: Digitivalva
- Species: D. hemiglypha

Binomial name
- Digitivalva hemiglypha Diakonoff & Arita, 1976

Species of moth

Digitivalva hemiglypha is a moth of the family Acrolepiidae. It is found in Japan (Kyushu).

The wingspan is 7–8 mm. Females are darker than males.
