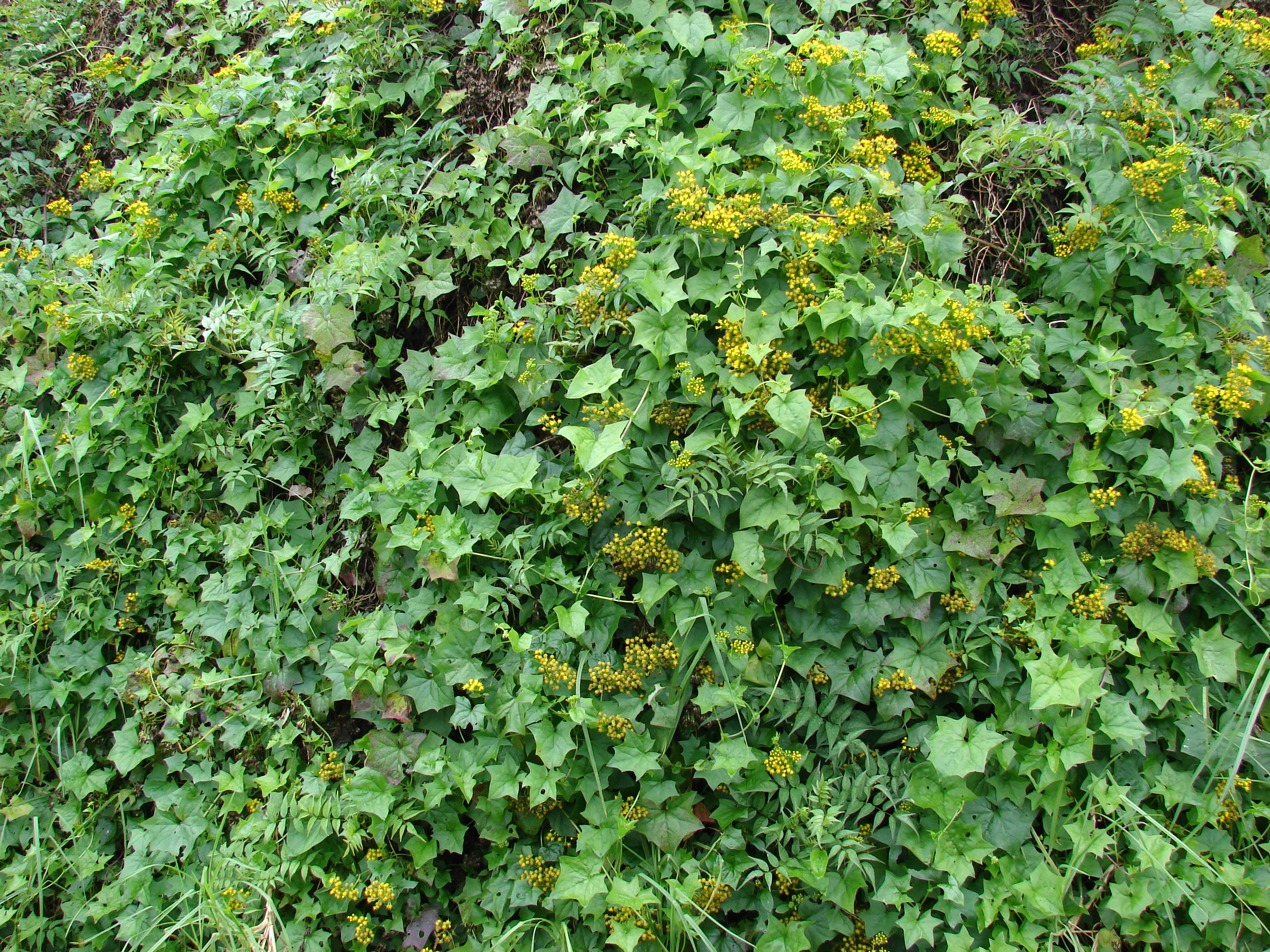
- Delairea odorata

Scientific classification
- Kingdom: Plantae
- Clade: Tracheophytes
- Clade: Angiosperms
- Clade: Eudicots
- Clade: Asterids
- Order: Asterales
- Family: Asteraceae
- Subfamily: Asteroideae
- Tribe: Senecioneae
- Genus: Delairea; Lem.

Species
- Delairea aparadensis; Delairea odorata

= Delairea =

Genus of flowering plants in the daisy family

Delairea is a genus of flowering plants within the family Asteraceae. Currently, it only features two species: Delairea odorata from Southern Africa, and the recently discovered Delairea aparadensis from Southern Brazil, which is critically endangered. D. odorata formerly belonged to the genus Senecio as Senecio mikanioides.
