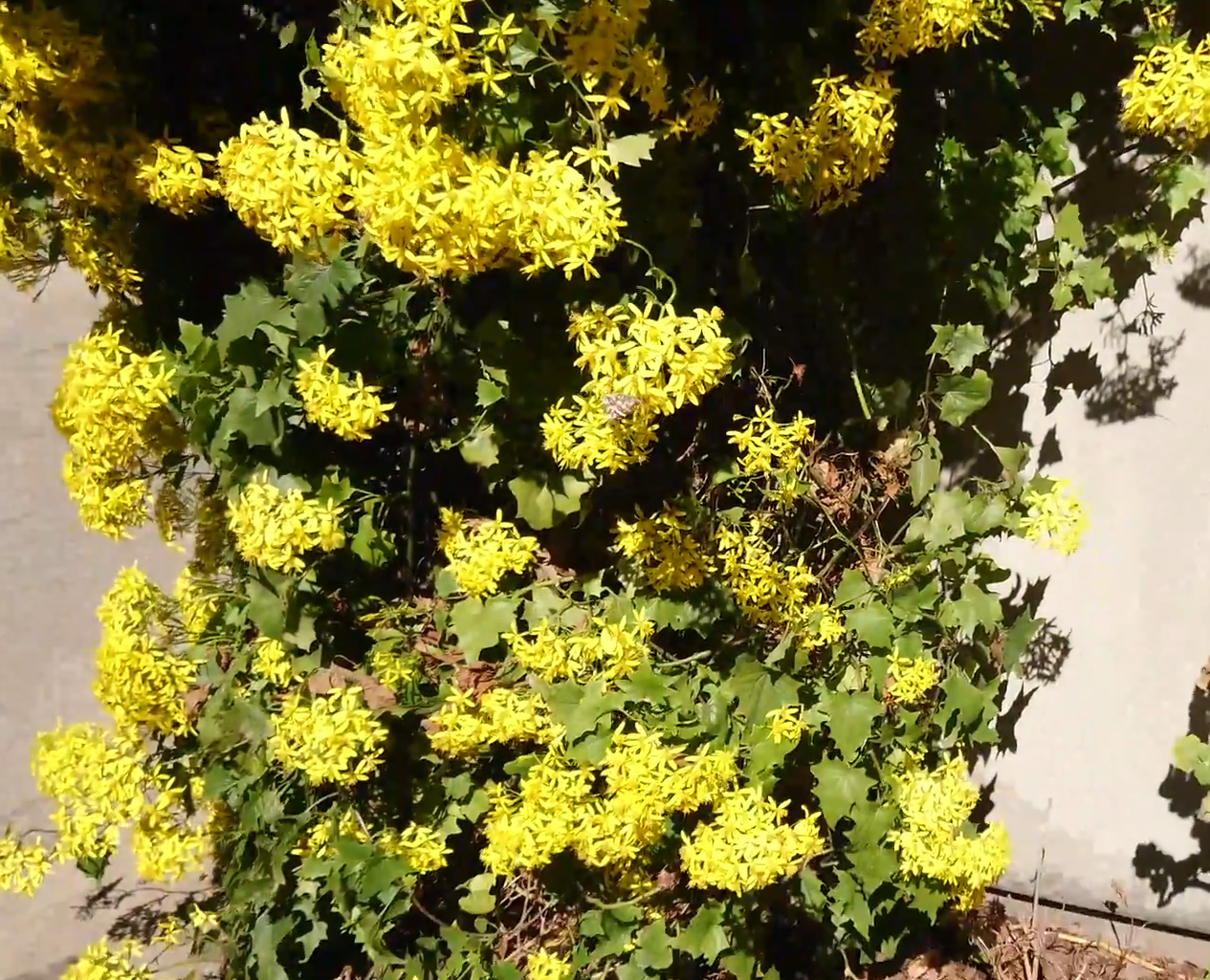

Scientific classification
- Kingdom: Plantae
- Clade: Tracheophytes
- Clade: Angiosperms
- Clade: Eudicots
- Clade: Asterids
- Order: Asterales
- Family: Asteraceae
- Genus: Senecio
- Species: S. tamoides

Binomial name
- Senecio tamoides DC. (1838)

= Senecio tamoides =

Species of vine

Senecio tamoides, also known as Canary creeper, is a climbing member of the genus Senecio of the family Asteraceae that is native to Southern Africa. It is used as an ornamental plant for its showy yellow, daisy-like flowers in late autumn through to winter. Other names for the plant include golden shower vine, false grapevine, and parlor ivy.

== Description ==
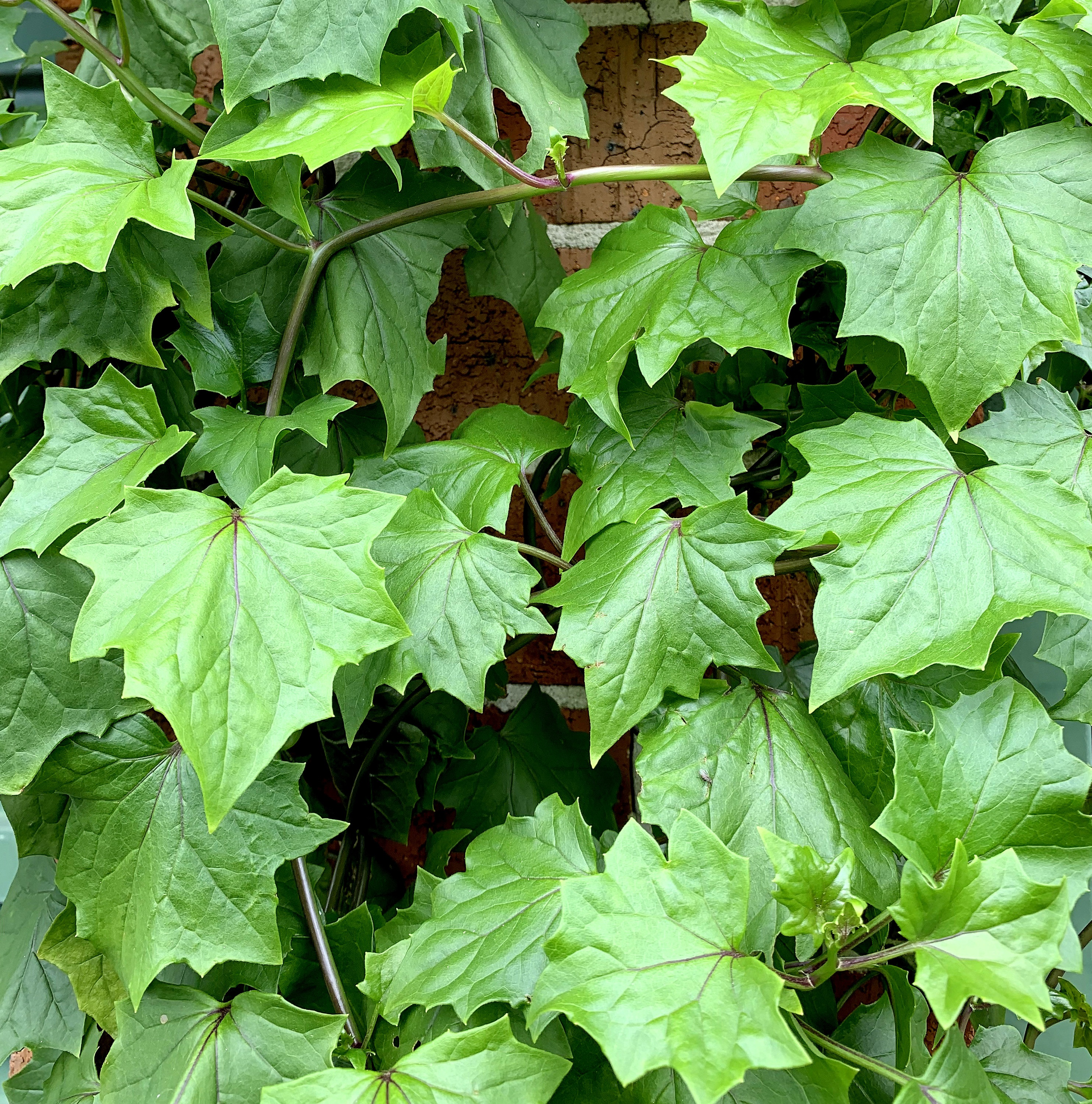
Grapevine-like leaves

It is a fast-growing, mostly evergreen, perennial climber with semi-succulent stems and leaves that creeps along the ground or twines several meters into the trees to reach the sunlit canopy where it can flower. It grows up to a height of 2 metres (6.6 ft) to 4 metres (13 ft) tall, though it can be as much as 10 metres (33 ft) tall in the right conditions.

=== Stems and leaves ===
Its stems are slender, 3 centimetres (1.2 in) to 4 centimetres (1.6 in) in diameter, usually purplish, semi-succulent and hairless that have a clear and sticky exudate.

Leaves are bright green, palmately lobed with purple venation, shaped like many ivy with broad, oval and fleshy surfaces, 4 centimetres (1.6 in) long and 7 centimetres (2.8 in) wide, coarsely toothed edges, leaf stalks 2 centimetres (0.79 in) to 5 centimetres (2.0 in) long.

=== Flowers ===
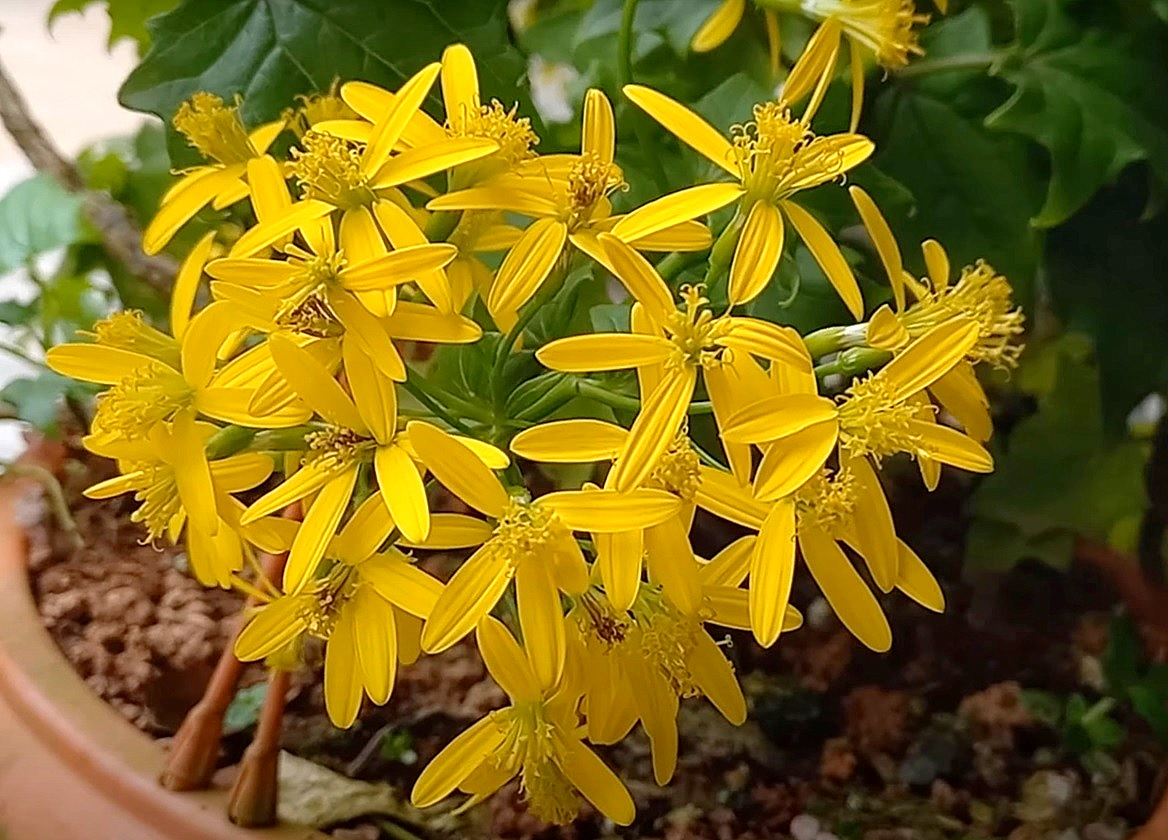
Close up of flowers

Its inflorescence is many-headed, bright yellow, and the raceme grows to have a flat top. The flower heads are cylindrical, about 3 millimetres (0.12 in) in diameter; surrounded with a whorl of five to seven bracts, 6 millimetres (0.24 in) to 7 millimetres (0.28 in) long which are surrounded by two to four smaller bracts or bracteoles. Flowers are cinnamon-scented that generally appear from mid autumn to winter. In New South Wales, it flowers in winter. In Western Australia, it flowers between April and May.

Three to six ray florets; each ligule approximately 1 centimetre (0.39 in) long; ten to twelve disc florets, 12 millimetres (0.47 in) to 15 millimetres (0.59 in) long. When cultivated in the gardens of the National Museums of Kenya, it has orange florets.

Achenes about 2 millimetres (0.079 in) long, and not hairy; pappus 6 millimetres (0.24 in) to 7 millimetres (0.28 in) long. It grows easily from stem cuttings.

== Distribution and habitat ==
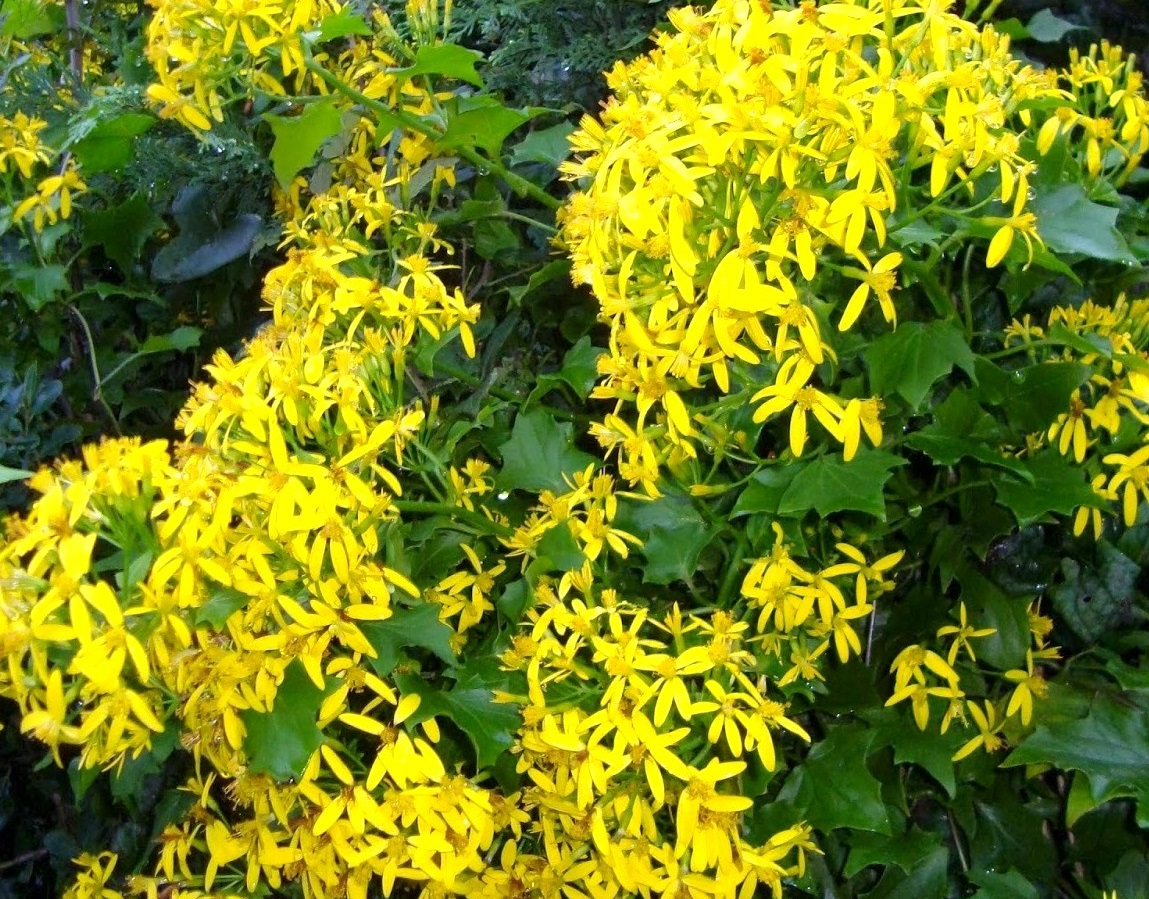
In its natural habitat

It is native to southern Africa where it occurs from coastal Eastern Cape in South Africa to eastern Zimbabwe, as well as in parts of the forests in KwaZulu-Natal and areas along the escarpment, including the bushveld savanna. It grows along evergreen forest margins at altitudes of 300 metres (980 ft) to 1,900 metres (6,200 ft) and in moist gullies. The plant has been introduced to Southeast Brazil, Colombia, Eritrea, Ethiopia, Guatemala, Mauritius, Queensland and Réunion.

=== Invasiveness ===
In Australia, it is sparingly found in moist gullies in Sydney, the North Coast and South Coast of New South Wales, and southeast Queensland, after escaping from the garden as an ornamental plant due to its seeds being dispersed by wind and parts of its stems being spread in disposed garden waste.

It is a species of concern in south-eastern Queensland, where it was ranked in a list that contains 100 most invasive species in the region. As such, the plant is listed on a few local weed lists in south-eastern Queensland. It is a pest plant in Redland Shire, an invasive plant in Gold Coast City, an unwelcome species in Burnett Shire, a significant non-declared pest plant in Maroochy Shire, and an unwanted species in Caboolture Shire. These reports, however, may have incorrectly applied the S. tamoides name to Senecio angulatus. Further, Atlas of Living Australia has misapplied S. tamoides for its D. odorata observations in Australia.

== Similar species ==
In Australia, Senecio tamoides has been misapplied and is usually considered to be Senecio angulatus since the two species bear a resemblance, though S. tamoides (Canary creeper) has leaves that are lighter greened, more ivy or grapevine-like, less glossier and more toothed. Moreover, Canary creeper has petals that are slightly more elongated, about 10 mm long, compared to those of S. angulatus, which are 6–9 mm long. Delairea odorata (formerly Senecio mikanioides), a related vine in the Senecioneae tribe, is also similar looking, but features small ear-shaped appendages at the base of the stalks of the leaves and flowers that lack obvious petals, whereas both S. angulatus and S. tamoides have daisy-like flowers with several petals. Unlike S. angulatus, which is more of a scrambler, S. tamoides and Delairea grow like typical vines where they intertwine and attach themselves on objects as they climb.

Despite its similarities to the aforementioned species, OneZoom indicates that S. tamoides is most closely related to other Senecio species, including Senecio keniophytum.

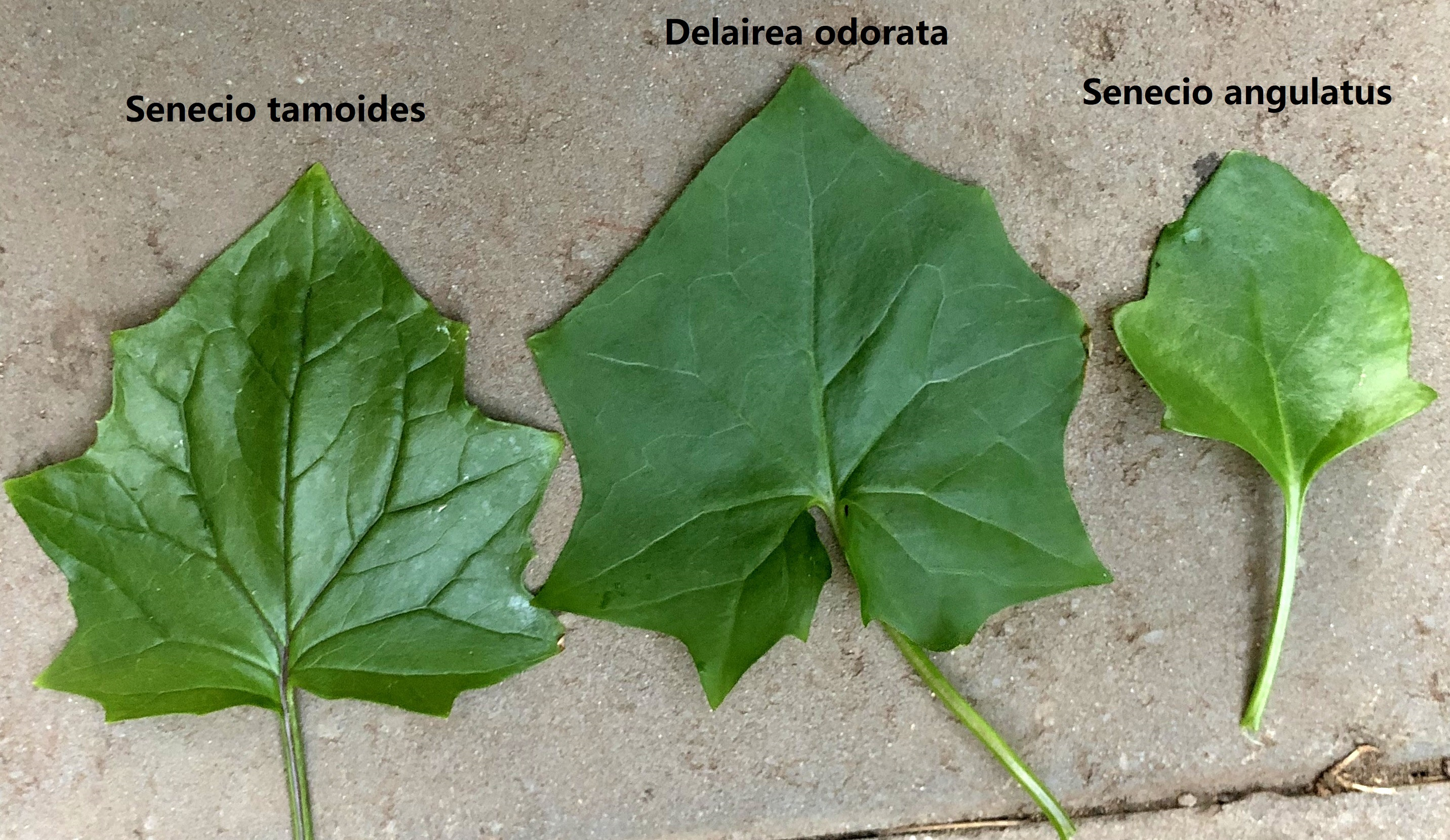
Leaf comparison of the Senecio vine species

== Cultivation ==
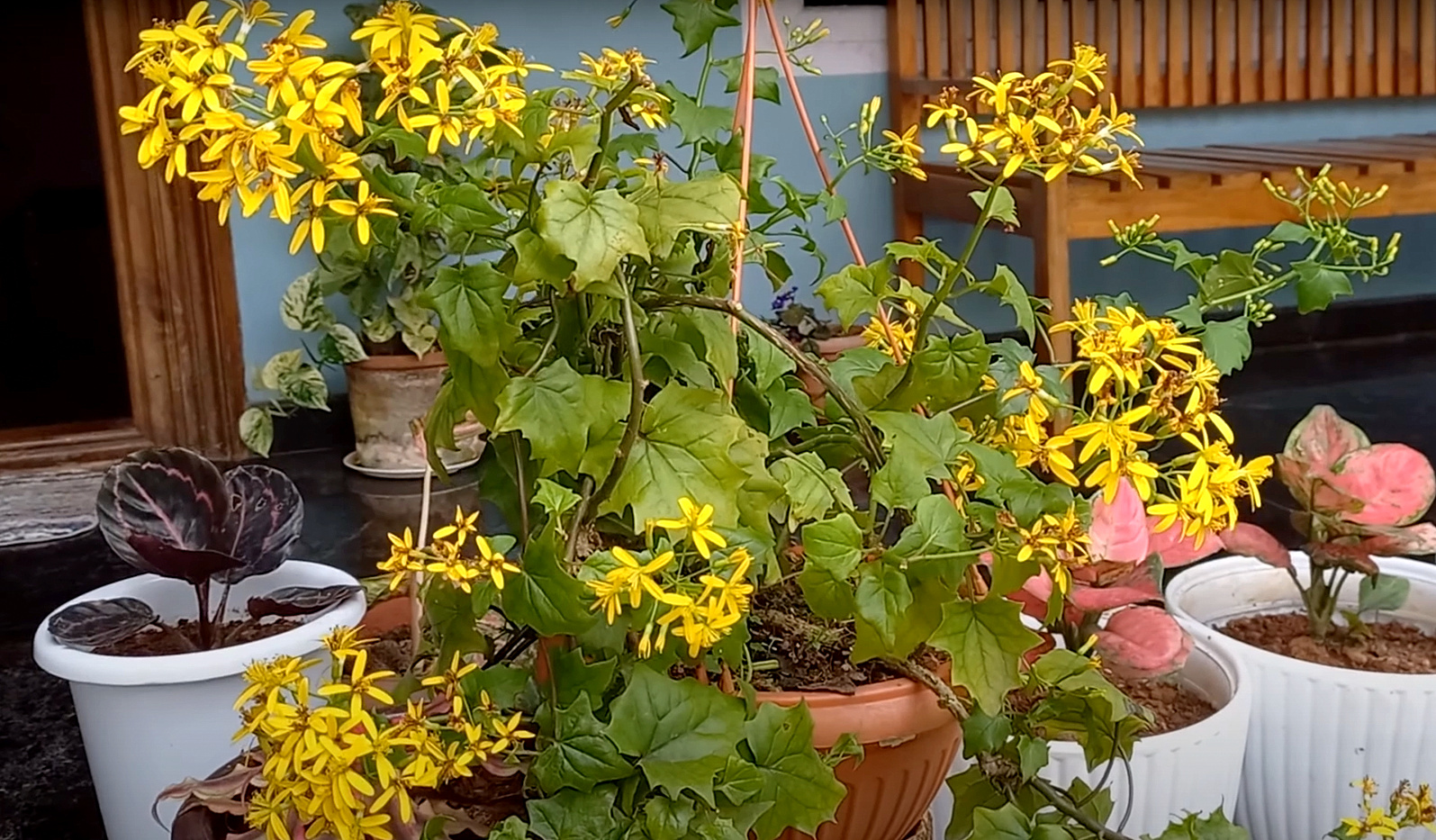
Potted houseplant

It is a fairly drought-tolerant, fast-growing garden plant that grows in well-drained soil towards a wall or fence, and may need some regular plant food for robust growth and abundant flowering. It needs moderate watering until it becomes established in sun to part shade areas. Its long stems require support to climb, such as on a trellis or a pergola. It can also be allowed to naturally creep through other shrubs or by planting beside a tree, leaving it to ascend by itself. The plant's growing tips should receive full sunshine for the flowers to develop, though the base can tolerate full shade.

Although naturally evergreen, it may be semi-deciduous in places that have frosty winters, where it will die back and recover again in spring. It can be pruned once in a while to maintain its spread in the garden. It can be grown from seed in spring, or from stem cuttings in summer. In Sweden, it is known as Sommarmurgröna ('summer ivy'), a name that is also interchangeably used for Delairea odorata, due to the fact that it grows in summer and dies back to the ground in the cold winter.

Medicinally, it has been traditionally used to treat flatulence and anthrax in cattle. Pests include aphids, red spider mite, caterpillars and whiteflies, and diseases include rust.

== Gallery ==
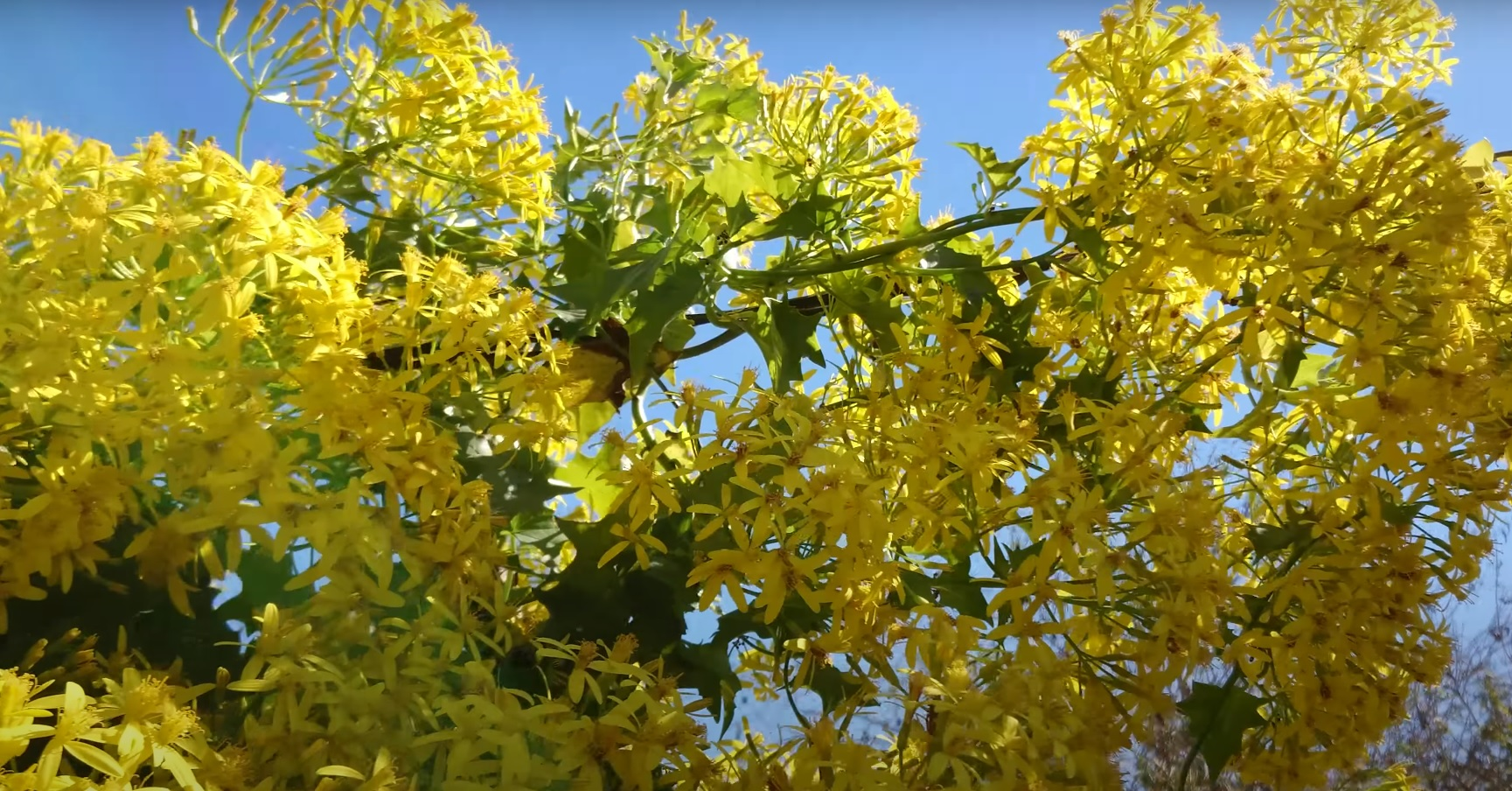
Clusters of golden flowers

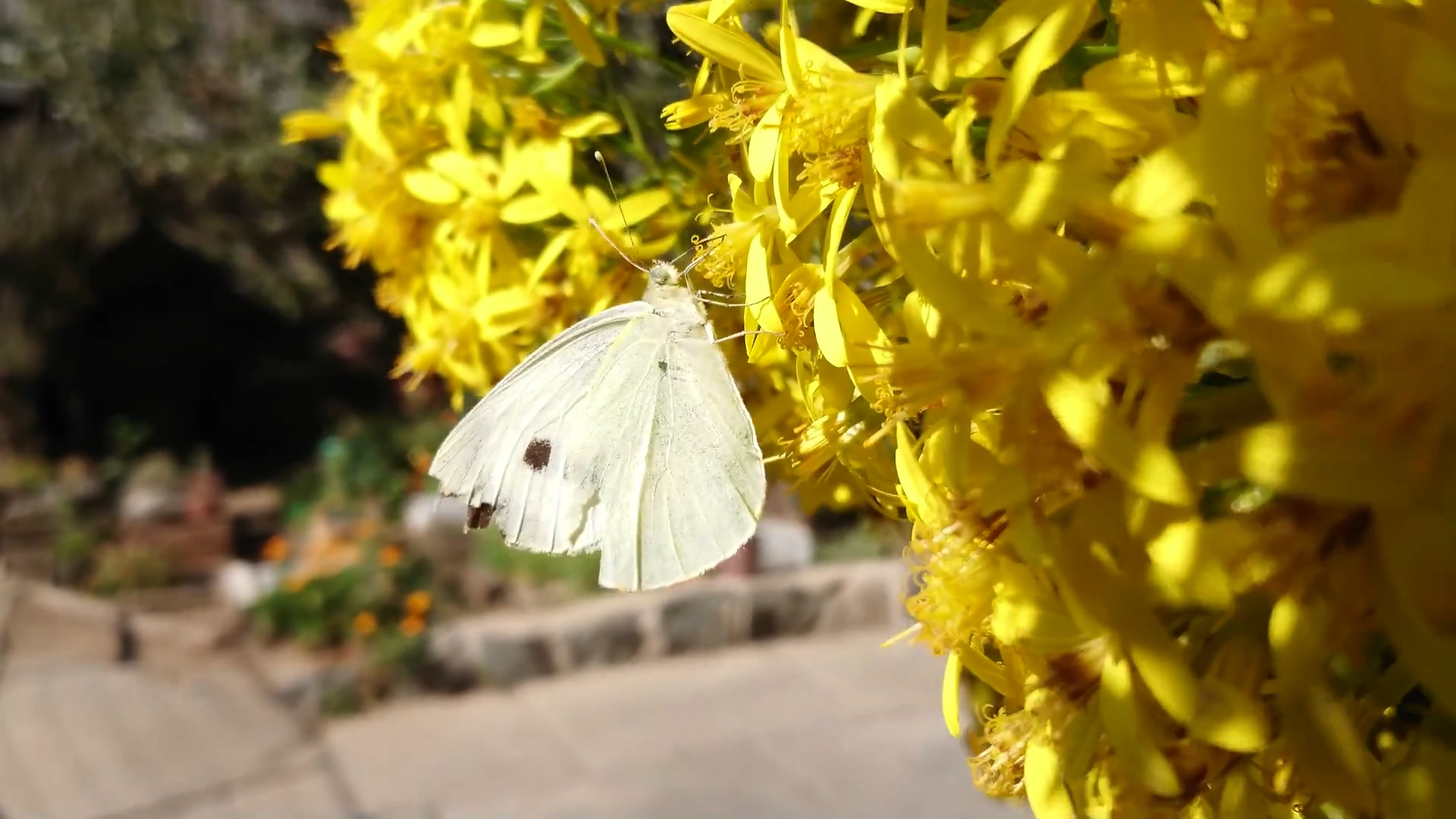
Butterfly pollination

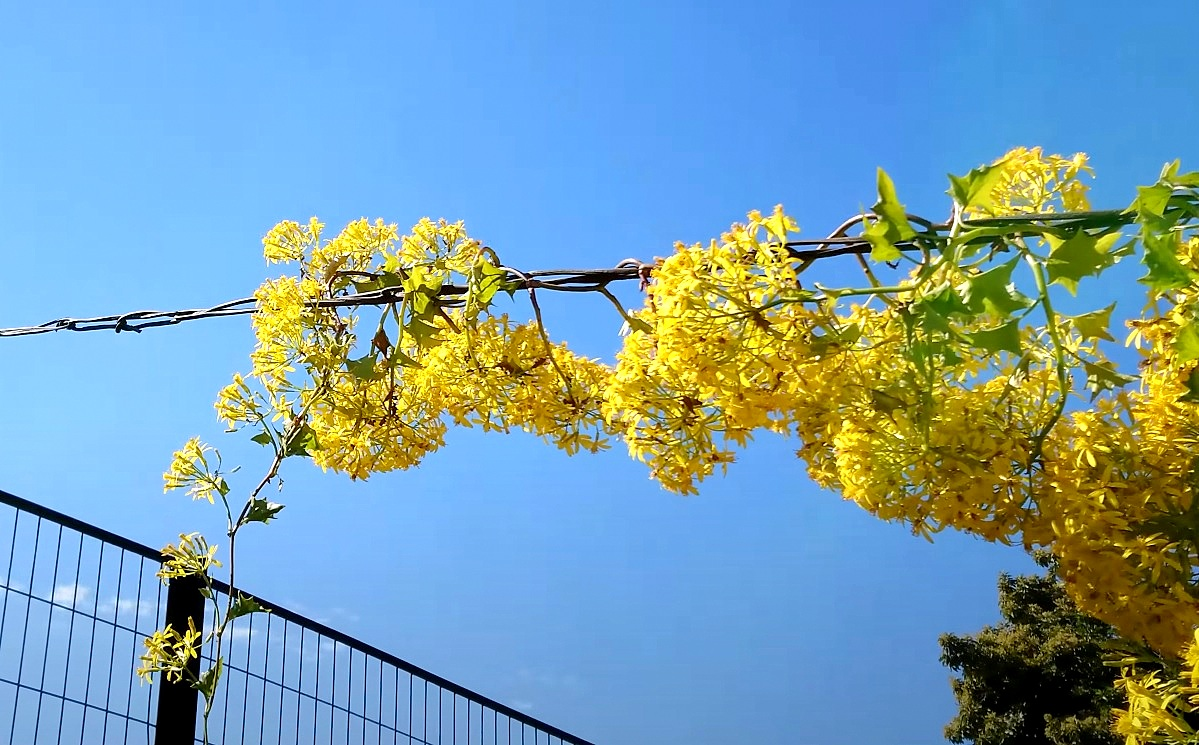
Trailing on a barbed wire

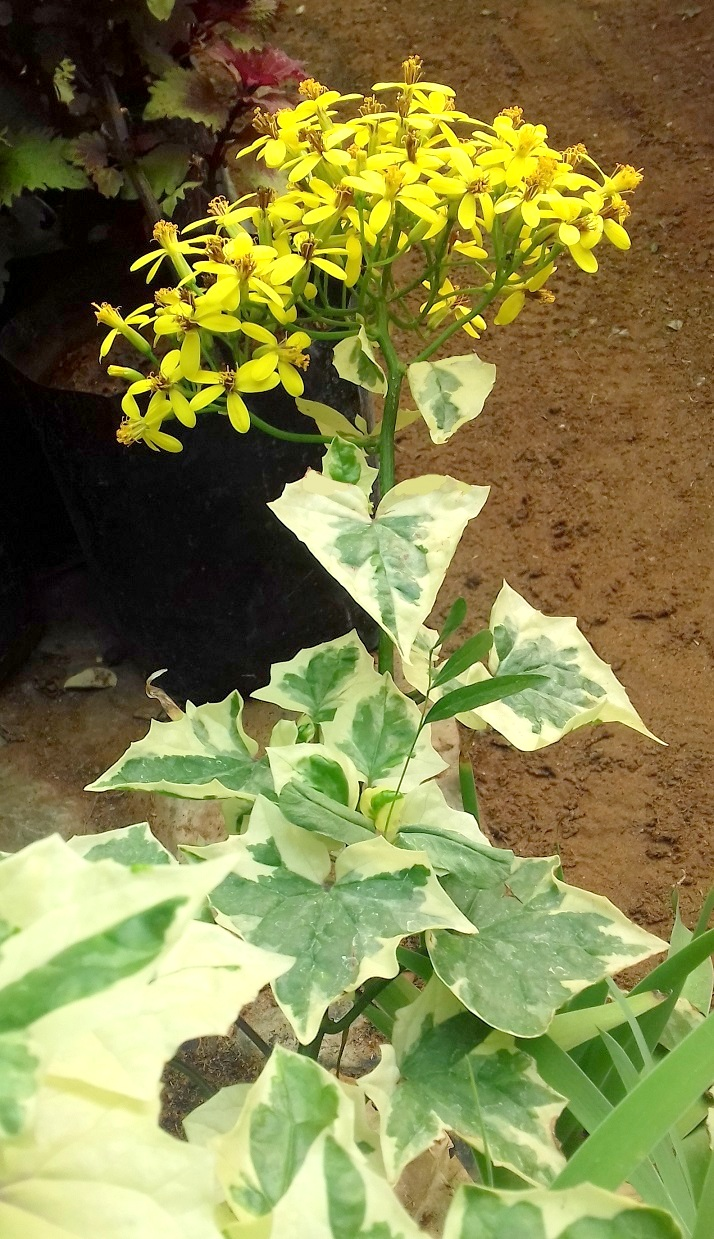
Variegated variety

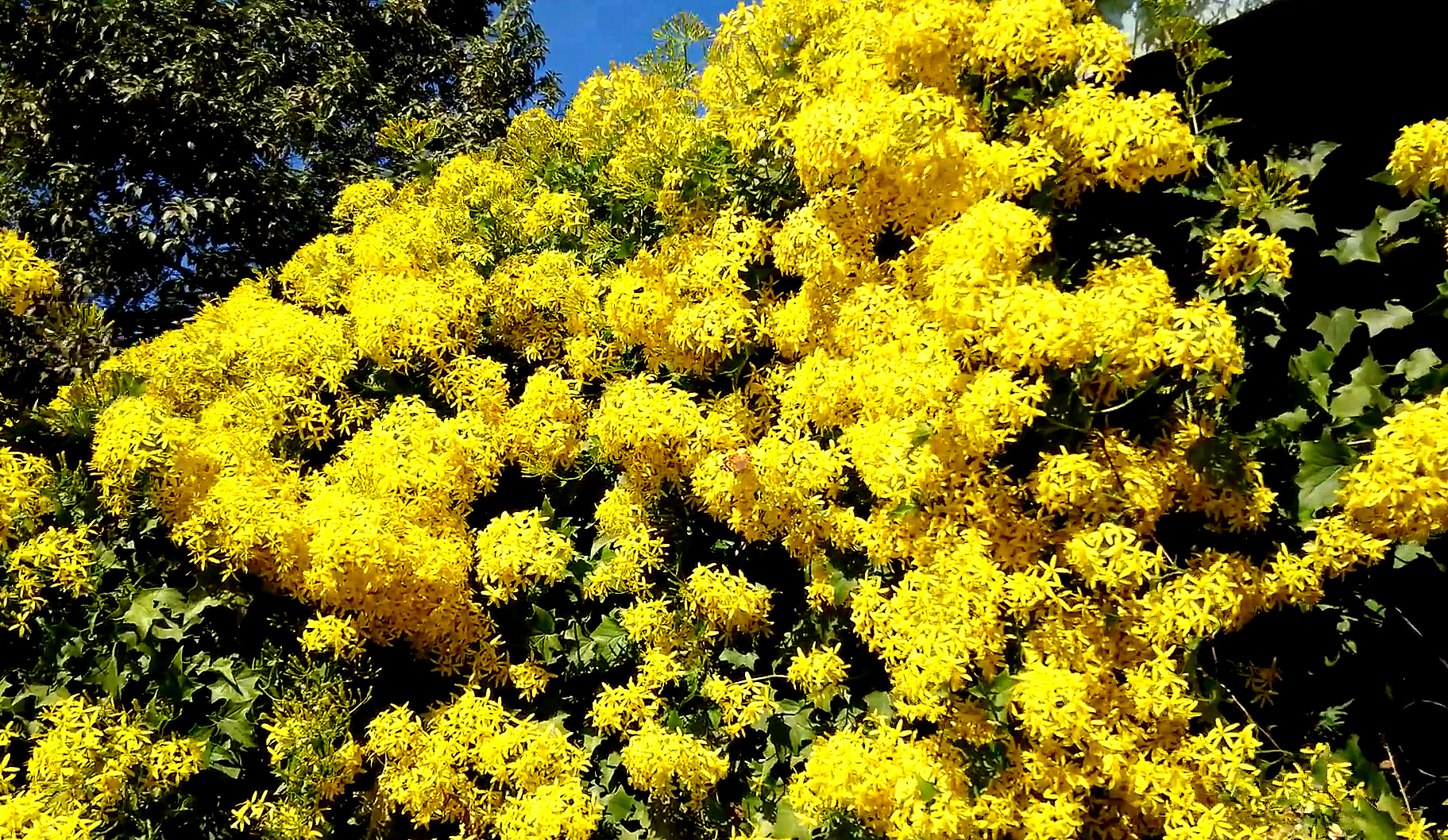
Full view of plant

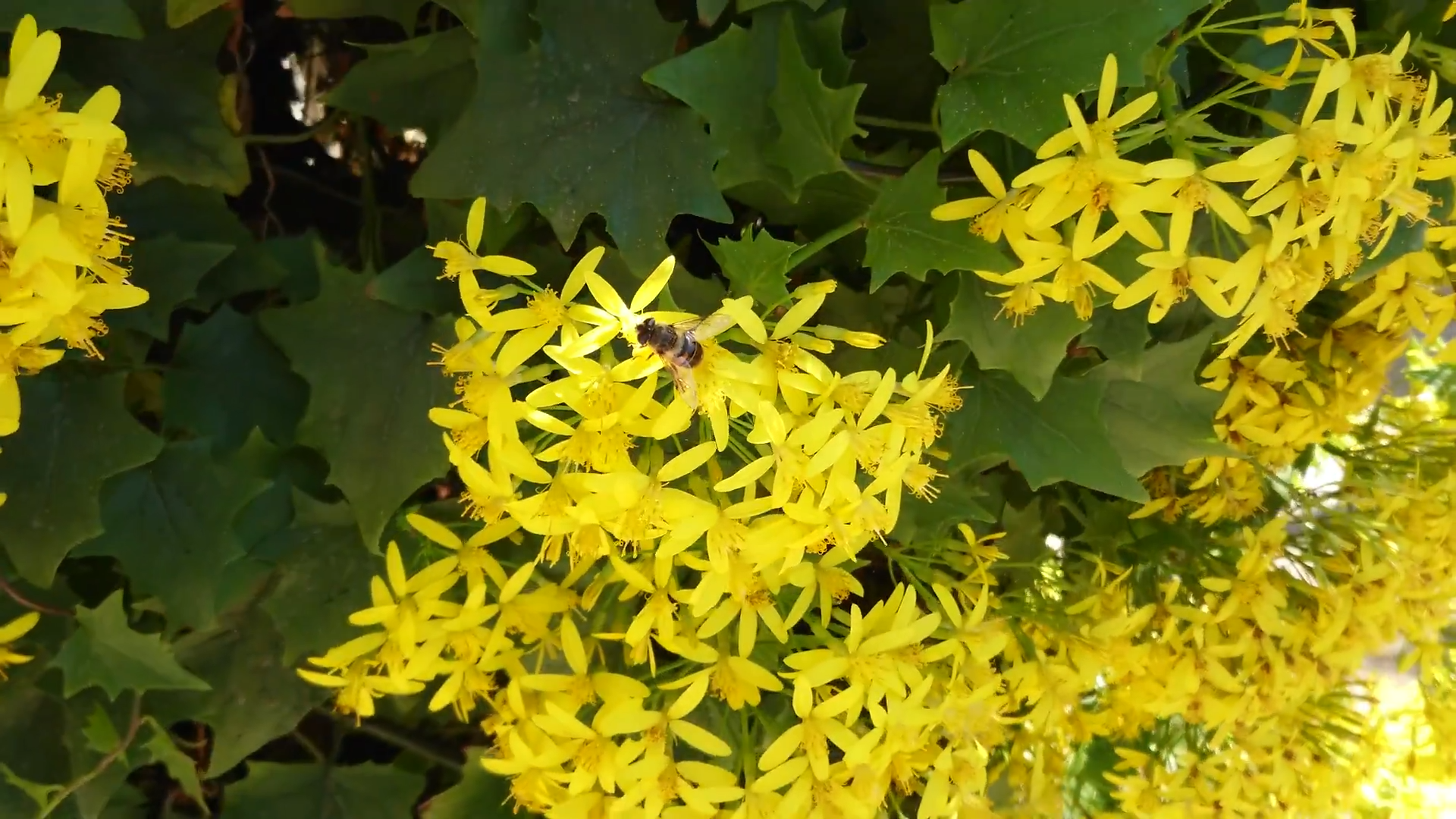
As a garden plant

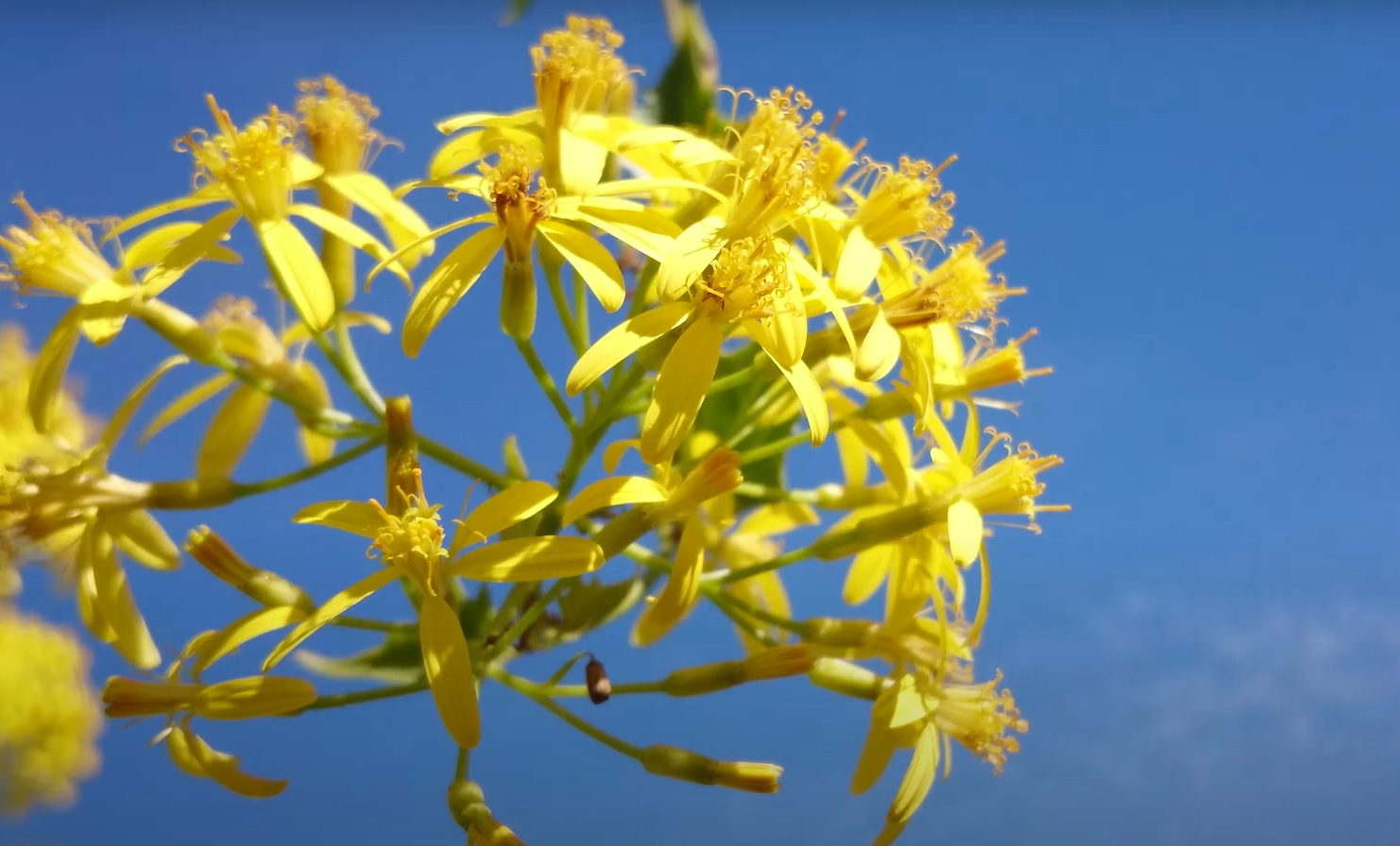
Flowers

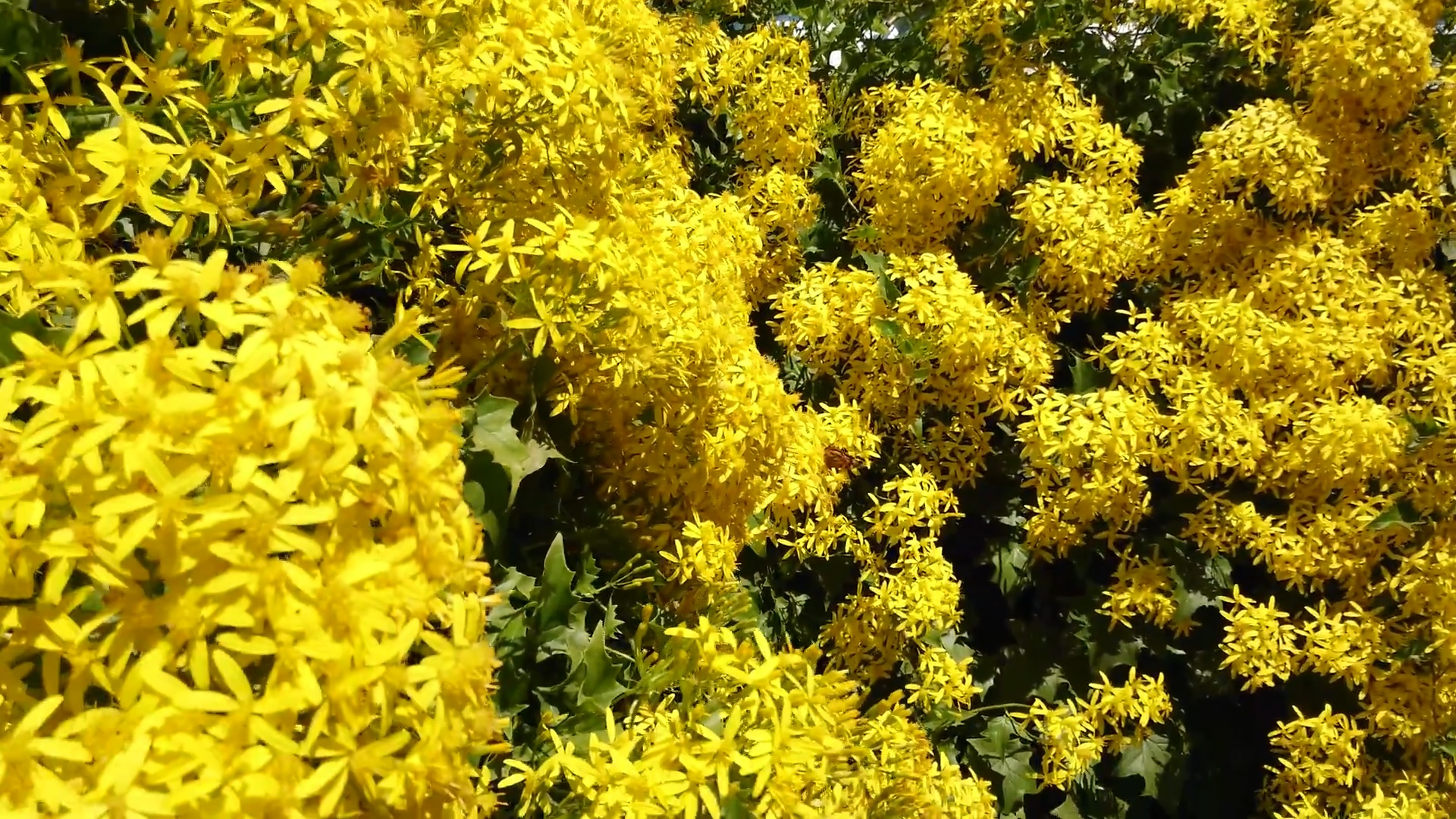
Clusters of golden yellow flowers

== See also ==
- Delairea odorata, a similar looking plant in the same tribe
- Senecio angulatus
