= Digitivalva eglanteriella =

Scientific classification
- Domain: Eukaryota
- Kingdom: Animalia
- Phylum: Arthropoda
- Class: Insecta
- Order: Lepidoptera
- Family: Acrolepiidae
- Genus: Digitivalva
- Species: D. eglanteriella

Binomial name
- Digitivalva eglanteriella (Mann, 1855)

Synonyms
- Roeslerstammia eglanteriella Mann, 1855; Acrolepia eglanteriella; Acrolepia cydoniella Rebel, 1916

Species of moth

Digitivalva eglanteriella is a moth of the family Acrolepiidae. It is found in France, Spain and Portugal and on Corsica and Crete.

The larvae feed on Helichrysum italicum. The larvae can be found from autumn to April.
