= Digitivalva amseli =

Scientific classification
- Kingdom: Animalia
- Phylum: Arthropoda
- Clade: Pancrustacea
- Class: Insecta
- Order: Lepidoptera
- Family: Acrolepiidae
- Genus: Digitivalva
- Species: D. amseli

Binomial name
- Digitivalva amseli Gaedike, 1975

Synonyms
- Acrolepia amseli Gaedike, 1975

Species of moth

Digitivalva amseli is a moth of the family Acrolepiidae. It was described by Reinhard Gaedike in 1975. It is found in Afghanistan.
