= Delairea aparadensis =

- In natural habit

Scientific classification
- Kingdom: Plantae
- Clade: Tracheophytes
- Clade: Angiosperms
- Clade: Eudicots
- Clade: Asterids
- Order: Asterales
- Family: Asteraceae
- Subfamily: Asteroideae
- Tribe: Senecioneae
- Genus: Delairea
- Species: D. aparadensis

Binomial name
- Delairea aparadensis Funez & Hassemer

Species of flowering plant in the daisy family

Delairea aparadensis is a species of plant in the family Asteraceae that is native to Brazil and was described in 2021.

== Discovery ==
Field work took place in southern Brazil from 2008 to 2020, where, in the latter year, a group of a scandent species of Senecioneae were discovered. The species looked morphologically distinct from the Brazilian native members of the Senecioneae tribe that are present in South America and were more comparable to those in southern Africa.

The 2021 report confirmed that the rambling species matched an undescribed species of Delairea (previously a monospecific genus), due the climbing habit, discoid flowers and the leaves' succulent nature.

== Description ==
A rambling subshrub and a perennial herb growing around 40 to 150 cm (16 to 59 in) tall, it features erect, glabrous, foliose, green stems with toothed, veined leaves which decrease in size towards the apex, and yellow discoid flowers. D. aparadensis is distinguished from D. odorata by its deltoid leaves, being a rambling subshrub (whereas D. odorata is a vine) and its inflorescences made up by cymes of 2–6 capitula (as opposed to dozens of capitula in D. odorata). Flowers appear in March in the region, or early autumn.

== Distribution ==
The species is found in Southern Brazil in regions such as, Aparados da Serra National Park, Morro da Igreja, in São Joaquim National Park, and at Urubici in Santa Catarina, where it is present in cloud forest environment, at elevations of 1,700–1,800 m (5,600–5,900 ft). Critically endangered, it is found roughly in area of occupancy of less than 1 km^{2} (0.4 sq mi) due to the agricultural spread in Santa Catarina.
