= Aiea =

Aiea or ʻAiea may refer to:

- Members of the Hawaiian flowering plant genus Nothocestrum
  - Nothocestrum breviflorum A.Gray - Smallflower ʻaiea (island of Hawaiʻi)
  - Nothocestrum latifolium A.Gray - Broadleaf ʻaiea (Maui, Molokaʻi, Lānaʻi, Oʻahu, Kauaʻi)
  - Nothocestrum longifolium A.Gray Longleaf ʻaiea (island of Hawaiʻi, Maui, Molokaʻi, Lānaʻi, Oʻahu, Kauaʻi)
  - Nothocestrum peltatum Skottsb. Oʻahu ʻaiea (Kauaʻi)
- Ilex anomala, a species of holly that is also endemic to Hawaiʻi
- Aiea, Hawaii, a CDP of Honolulu on the island of Oʻahu
- AIEA or IAEA, International Atomic Energy Agency, an international organization that seeks to promote the peaceful use of nuclear energy, and to inhibit its use for any military purpose, including nuclear weapons
