= Acrolepia beardsleyi =

Scientific classification
- Kingdom: Animalia
- Phylum: Arthropoda
- Class: Insecta
- Order: Lepidoptera
- Family: Acrolepiidae
- Genus: Acrolepia
- Species: A. beardsleyi

Binomial name
- Acrolepia beardsleyi Zimmerman, 1978

Species of moth

Acrolepia beardsleyi is a moth of the family Acrolepiidae. It was first described by Elwood Zimmerman in 1978. It is endemic to the Hawaiian island of Maui.

The wingspan is 9–10 mm.

The larvae feed on Nothocestrum species. They mine the leaves of their host plant.

The cocoon is made of white to pale brown silk. The pupa has mostly conical and strongly protuberant spiracles.
