= Acrolepia xylophragma =

Scientific classification
- Kingdom: Animalia
- Phylum: Arthropoda
- Class: Insecta
- Order: Lepidoptera
- Family: Acrolepiidae
- Genus: Acrolepia
- Species: A. xylophragma

Binomial name
- Acrolepia xylophragma (Meyrick, 1926)

Species of moth

Acrolepia xylophragma is a moth of the family Acrolepiidae. It is known from South Africa.
