= Acrolepia aureonigrella =

Scientific classification
- Kingdom: Animalia
- Phylum: Arthropoda
- Class: Insecta
- Order: Lepidoptera
- Family: Acrolepiidae
- Genus: Acrolepia
- Species: A. aureonigrella

Binomial name
- Acrolepia aureonigrella Walsingham, 1907

Species of moth

Acrolepia aureonigrella is a moth of the family Acrolepiidae. It was first described by Lord Walsingham in 1907. It is endemic to the Hawaiian island of Molokai.

The larvae probably feed on Nothocestrum species. They probably mine the leaves of their host plant.
