= Acrolepiopsis californica =

Scientific classification
- Kingdom: Animalia
- Phylum: Arthropoda
- Clade: Pancrustacea
- Class: Insecta
- Order: Lepidoptera
- Family: Acrolepiidae
- Genus: Acrolepiopsis
- Species: A. californica

Binomial name
- Acrolepiopsis californica Gaedike, 1984

Synonyms
- Acrolepiopsis liliivora Gaedike, 1994

Species of moth

Acrolepiopsis californica is a moth of the family Acrolepiidae. It is found in western California, western Oregon and Alberta.

The length of the forewings is 4.4–6.7 mm.

Larvae have been reared on Lilium pardalinum, Lilium washingtonianum, Disporum hookeri and possibly Disporum trachycarpum. They have been observed mining the fruit of their host plant.
