= Acrolepiopsis issikiella =

Scientific classification
- Kingdom: Animalia
- Phylum: Arthropoda
- Clade: Pancrustacea
- Class: Insecta
- Order: Lepidoptera
- Family: Acrolepiidae
- Genus: Acrolepiopsis
- Species: A. issikiella

Binomial name
- Acrolepiopsis issikiella (Moriuti, 1961)

Synonyms
- Acrolepia issikiella Moriuti, 1961

Species of moth

Acrolepiopsis issikiella is a moth of the family Acrolepiidae. It was described by Sigeru Moriuti in 1961. It is found in Japan.

The wingspan is 11–12 mm. There are several generations per year. The adults emerge in autumn and overwinter. Larvae can be found from summer to mid-autumn.
