= Acrolepia moriuti =

Scientific classification
- Kingdom: Animalia
- Phylum: Arthropoda
- Clade: Pancrustacea
- Class: Insecta
- Order: Lepidoptera
- Family: Acrolepiidae
- Genus: Acrolepia
- Species: A. moriuti

Binomial name
- Acrolepia moriuti (Gaedike, 1982)

Synonyms
- Digitivalva moriuti Gaedike, 1982

Species of moth

Acrolepia moriuti is a moth of the family Acrolepiidae. It was described by Reinhard Gaedike in 1982. It is found in Japan.
