= Acrolepia aleuritis =

Scientific classification
- Kingdom: Animalia
- Phylum: Arthropoda
- Class: Insecta
- Order: Lepidoptera
- Family: Acrolepiidae
- Genus: Acrolepia
- Species: A. aleuritis

Binomial name
- Acrolepia aleuritis Meyrick, 1913

Species of moth

Acrolepia aleuritis is a moth of the family Acrolepiidae. It was described by Edward Meyrick in 1913. It is found in Sri Lanka.
