= Acrolepiopsis clavivalvatella =

Scientific classification
- Kingdom: Animalia
- Phylum: Arthropoda
- Class: Insecta
- Order: Lepidoptera
- Family: Acrolepiidae
- Genus: Acrolepiopsis
- Species: A. clavivalvatella

Binomial name
- Acrolepiopsis clavivalvatella (Moriuti, 1972)

Synonyms
- Acrolepia clavivalvatella Moriuti, 1972

Species of moth

Acrolepiopsis clavivalvatella is a moth of the family Acrolepiidae. It was described by Sigeru Moriuti in 1972. It is found in Japan.

The wingspan is 9.5-11.5 mm.
