= Acrolepiopsis japonica =

Scientific classification
- Kingdom: Animalia
- Phylum: Arthropoda
- Clade: Pancrustacea
- Class: Insecta
- Order: Lepidoptera
- Family: Acrolepiidae
- Genus: Acrolepiopsis
- Species: A. japonica

Binomial name
- Acrolepiopsis japonica (Gaedike, 1982)

Synonyms
- Acrolepia japonica Gaedike, 1982

Species of moth

Acrolepiopsis japonica is a moth of the family Acrolepiidae. It was described by Reinhard Gaedike in 1982. It is found in Japan.

The larvae are borers in Dioscorea japonica.
