= Acrolepiopsis persimilis =

Scientific classification
- Kingdom: Animalia
- Phylum: Arthropoda
- Class: Insecta
- Order: Lepidoptera
- Family: Acrolepiidae
- Genus: Acrolepiopsis
- Species: A. persimilis

Binomial name
- Acrolepiopsis persimilis (Moriuti, 1974)

Synonyms
- Acrolepia persimilis Moriuti, 1974

Species of moth

Acrolepiopsis persimilis is a moth of the family Acrolepiidae. It was described by Sigeru Moriuti in 1974. It is found in Japan.

The wingspan is 9–12 mm.
