= Acrolepia chalarodesma =

Scientific classification
- Kingdom: Animalia
- Phylum: Arthropoda
- Class: Insecta
- Order: Lepidoptera
- Family: Acrolepiidae
- Genus: Acrolepia
- Species: A. chalarodesma

Binomial name
- Acrolepia chalarodesma Meyrick, 1927

Species of moth

Acrolepia chalarodesma is a moth of the family Acrolepiidae. It is known from South Africa.
