= Acrolepiopsis heppneri =

Scientific classification
- Kingdom: Animalia
- Phylum: Arthropoda
- Clade: Pancrustacea
- Class: Insecta
- Order: Lepidoptera
- Family: Acrolepiidae
- Genus: Acrolepiopsis
- Species: A. heppneri

Binomial name
- Acrolepiopsis heppneri Gaedike, 1984

Species of moth

Acrolepiopsis heppneri is a moth of the family Acrolepiidae. It is found from Connecticut and New Hampshire in the east, south to Tennessee, Alabama and Mississippi, and west to Illinois.

The length of their forewings are 5–5.6 mm.

Larvae have been reared on Smilax tamnoides. They skeletonize the underside of a leaf of their host plant from within a black, frass-covered silken tube. placed alongside a leaf vein. The larvae are pale green with a pale brownish-yellow head.
