= Acrolepiopsis sapporensis =

Scientific classification
- Domain: Eukaryota
- Kingdom: Animalia
- Phylum: Arthropoda
- Class: Insecta
- Order: Lepidoptera
- Family: Acrolepiidae
- Genus: Acrolepiopsis
- Species: A. sapporensis

Binomial name
- Acrolepiopsis sapporensis Matsumura, 1931

Synonyms
- Diplodoma marginepunctella f. sapporensis Matsumura, 1931; Narycia marginepunctella sapporensis; Acrolepia sapporensis; Acrolepia alliella Semenov and Kuznetsov, 1956

Species of moth

Acrolepiopsis sapporensis (Asiatic onion leafminer) is a moth of the family Acrolepiidae. It is native to Asia, where it is found from China and Mongolia to Russia, Korea and Japan. It is an introduced species in Hawaii, where it was initially misidentified as Acrolepiopsis assectella.

The length of the forewings is 4.7–5 mm.

The larvae feed on Allium fistulosum, Allium cepa, Allium porrum, Allium odorum, Allium nipponicum and Allium schoenoprasum.
