= Acrolepia chariphanes =

Scientific classification
- Kingdom: Animalia
- Phylum: Arthropoda
- Class: Insecta
- Order: Lepidoptera
- Family: Acrolepiidae
- Genus: Acrolepia
- Species: A. chariphanes

Binomial name
- Acrolepia chariphanes Meyrick, 1931

Species of moth

Acrolepia chariphanes is a moth of the family Acrolepiidae. It was described by Edward Meyrick in 1931. It is found in Chile.
