= Acrolepia asiatica =

Scientific classification
- Kingdom: Animalia
- Phylum: Arthropoda
- Clade: Pancrustacea
- Class: Insecta
- Order: Lepidoptera
- Family: Acrolepiidae
- Genus: Acrolepia
- Species: A. asiatica

Binomial name
- Acrolepia asiatica Gaedike, 1971

Species of moth

Acrolepia asiatica is a moth of the family Acrolepiidae. It was described by Reinhard Gaedike in 1971. It is found in China.
