= Acrolepia afghanistanella =

Scientific classification
- Kingdom: Animalia
- Phylum: Arthropoda
- Clade: Pancrustacea
- Class: Insecta
- Order: Lepidoptera
- Family: Acrolepiidae
- Genus: Acrolepia
- Species: A. afghanistanella

Binomial name
- Acrolepia afghanistanella Gaedike, 1968

Species of moth

Acrolepia afghanistanella is a moth of the family Acrolepiidae. It was described by Reinhard Gaedike in 1968. It is found in Afghanistan.
