= Acrolepiopsis leucoscia =

Scientific classification
- Kingdom: Animalia
- Phylum: Arthropoda
- Class: Insecta
- Order: Lepidoptera
- Family: Acrolepiidae
- Genus: Acrolepiopsis
- Species: A. leucoscia

Binomial name
- Acrolepiopsis leucoscia (Meyrick, 1927)

Synonyms
- Acrolepia leucoscia Meyrick, 1927

Species of moth

Acrolepiopsis leucoscia is a moth of the family Acrolepiidae. It was described by Edward Meyrick in 1927. It is found in the central United States, from Texas north to Illinois, Missouri and Ohio.

The length of the forewings 6.7–7.7 mm.
