= Acrolepia aureella =

Scientific classification
- Kingdom: Animalia
- Phylum: Arthropoda
- Class: Insecta
- Order: Lepidoptera
- Family: Acrolepiidae
- Genus: Acrolepia
- Species: A. aureella

Binomial name
- Acrolepia aureella (Blanchard, 1852)

Synonyms
- Elachista aureella Blanchard, 1852; Acrolepiopsis aureella

Species of moth

Acrolepia aureella is a moth of the family Acrolepiidae. It was described by Blanchard in 1852. It is found in Chile.
