= Acrolepia maculella =

Scientific classification
- Kingdom: Animalia
- Phylum: Arthropoda
- Clade: Pancrustacea
- Class: Insecta
- Order: Lepidoptera
- Family: Acrolepiidae
- Genus: Acrolepia
- Species: A. maculella

Binomial name
- Acrolepia maculella (Blanchard, 1852)

Synonyms
- Elachista maculella Blanchard, 1852

Species of moth

Acrolepia maculella is a moth of the family Acrolepiidae. It was described by Blanchard in 1852. It is found in Chile.
