= Acrolepiopsis delta =

Scientific classification
- Kingdom: Animalia
- Phylum: Arthropoda
- Class: Insecta
- Order: Lepidoptera
- Family: Acrolepiidae
- Genus: Acrolepiopsis
- Species: A. delta

Binomial name
- Acrolepiopsis delta (Moriuti, 1961)

Synonyms
- Acrolepia delta Moriuti, 1961; Acrolepia albicomella Moriuti, 1972

Species of moth

Acrolepiopsis delta is a moth of the family Acrolepiidae. It was described by Sigeru Moriuti in 1972. It is found in Japan.
