= Acrolepia prasinaula =

Scientific classification
- Kingdom: Animalia
- Phylum: Arthropoda
- Class: Insecta
- Order: Lepidoptera
- Family: Acrolepiidae
- Genus: Acrolepia
- Species: A. prasinaula

Binomial name
- Acrolepia prasinaula Meyrick, 1927

Species of moth

Acrolepia prasinaula is a moth of the family Acrolepiidae. It was described by Edward Meyrick in 1927. It is found in Colombia.
