= Acrolepia niphosperma =

Scientific classification
- Kingdom: Animalia
- Phylum: Arthropoda
- Class: Insecta
- Order: Lepidoptera
- Family: Acrolepiidae
- Genus: Acrolepia
- Species: A. niphosperma

Binomial name
- Acrolepia niphosperma Meyrick, 1931

Species of moth

Acrolepia niphosperma is a moth of the family Acrolepiidae. It was described by Edward Meyrick in 1931. It is found in Argentina.
