= Acrolepia halosema =

Scientific classification
- Kingdom: Animalia
- Phylum: Arthropoda
- Class: Insecta
- Order: Lepidoptera
- Family: Acrolepiidae
- Genus: Acrolepia
- Species: A. halosema

Binomial name
- Acrolepia halosema Meyrick, 1931

Species of moth

Acrolepia halosema is a moth of the family Acrolepiidae. It was described by Edward Meyrick in 1931. It is found in Argentina.
