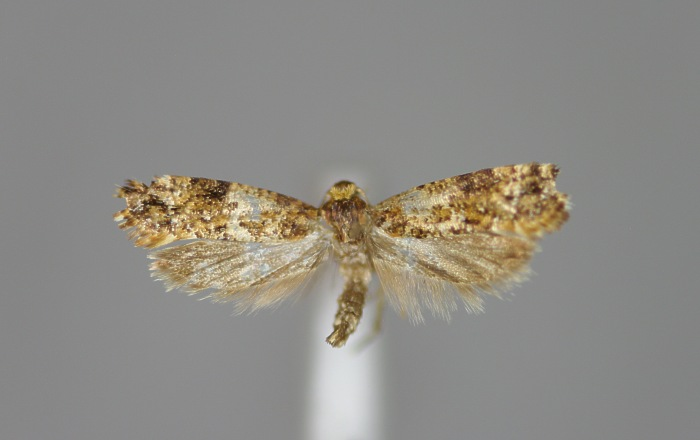

Scientific classification
- Kingdom: Animalia
- Phylum: Arthropoda
- Class: Insecta
- Order: Lepidoptera
- Family: Acrolepiidae
- Genus: Acrolepia
- Species: A. autumnitella

Binomial name
- Acrolepia autumnitella Curtis, 1838

Synonyms
- Roeslerstammia heleniella Zeller, 1839; Haemilis lefebvriella Duponchel, 1838; Tortrix pygmeana Haworth, 1811; Tinea submontana Osthelder, 1951

= Acrolepia autumnitella =

Species of moth

Acrolepia autumnitella is a species of moth of the family Acrolepiidae. It is found in most parts of Europe. The wingspan ranges from 11 to 13 mm. The forewings are less elongate [than in Digitivalva granitella], ochreous - brown to dark fuscous, irregularly strigulated with black and whitish; two blackish costal spots near middle; a triangular dorsal spot of whitish strigulae before middle; a black sinuate streak in disc towards apex; a whitish bar in middle of terminal cilia. Hindwings are dark grey, lighter anteriorly. The larva is whitish-green; head brownish,
