= Acrolepia canachopis =

Scientific classification
- Kingdom: Animalia
- Phylum: Arthropoda
- Class: Insecta
- Order: Lepidoptera
- Family: Acrolepiidae
- Genus: Acrolepia
- Species: A. canachopis

Binomial name
- Acrolepia canachopis Meyrick, 1913

Species of moth

Acrolepia canachopis is a moth of the family Acrolepiidae. It is known from South Africa.
