= Acrolepiopsis suzukiella =

Scientific classification
- Kingdom: Animalia
- Phylum: Arthropoda
- Clade: Pancrustacea
- Class: Insecta
- Order: Lepidoptera
- Family: Acrolepiidae
- Genus: Acrolepiopsis
- Species: A. suzukiella

Binomial name
- Acrolepiopsis suzukiella (Matsumura, 1931)

Synonyms
- Argyresthia suzukiella Matsumura, 1931; Acrolepia suzukiella; Acrolepia dioscoreae Moriuti, 1961

Species of moth

Acrolepiopsis suzukiella is a moth of the family Acrolepiidae. It was described by Shōnen Matsumura in 1931. It is found in Japan.

The wingspan is 9–12 mm.

The larvae feed on Dioscorea species.
