= Acrolepia peyerhimoffella =

Scientific classification
- Kingdom: Animalia
- Phylum: Arthropoda
- Class: Insecta
- Order: Lepidoptera
- Family: Acrolepiidae
- Genus: Acrolepia
- Species: A. peyerhimoffella

Binomial name
- Acrolepia peyerhimoffella Sand, 1879

Species of moth

Acrolepia peyerhimoffella is a moth of the family Acrolepiidae. It was described by Sand in 1879.
