= Acrolepiopsis mauli =

Scientific classification
- Domain: Eukaryota
- Kingdom: Animalia
- Phylum: Arthropoda
- Class: Insecta
- Order: Lepidoptera
- Family: Acrolepiidae
- Genus: Acrolepiopsis
- Species: A. mauli

Binomial name
- Acrolepiopsis mauli Gaedike & Karsholt, 2001

Species of moth

Acrolepiopsis mauli is a moth of the family Acrolepiidae that is endemic to Madeira.
