= Acrolepia gelida =

Scientific classification
- Kingdom: Animalia
- Phylum: Arthropoda
- Class: Insecta
- Order: Lepidoptera
- Family: Acrolepiidae
- Genus: Acrolepia
- Species: A. gelida

Binomial name
- Acrolepia gelida Meyrick, 1921

Species of moth

Acrolepia gelida is a moth of the family Acrolepiidae. It is known from South Africa.
