= Acrolepia cestrella =

Scientific classification
- Kingdom: Animalia
- Phylum: Arthropoda
- Class: Insecta
- Order: Lepidoptera
- Family: Acrolepiidae
- Genus: Acrolepia
- Species: A. cestrella

Binomial name
- Acrolepia cestrella Busck, 1934

Species of moth

Acrolepia cestrella is a moth of the family Acrolepiidae. It was described by August Busck in 1934. It is found on Cuba.
