= Acrolepiopsis postomacula =

Scientific classification
- Kingdom: Animalia
- Phylum: Arthropoda
- Clade: Pancrustacea
- Class: Insecta
- Order: Lepidoptera
- Family: Acrolepiidae
- Genus: Acrolepiopsis
- Species: A. postomacula

Binomial name
- Acrolepiopsis postomacula (Matsumura, 1931)

Synonyms
- Eidophasia postomacula Matsumura, 1931; Acrolepia postomacula; Acrolepia argolitha Meyrick, 1932

Species of moth

Acrolepiopsis postomacula is a moth of the family Acrolepiidae. It was described by Shōnen Matsumura in 1931. It is found in Japan

The larvae feed on Hosta lancifolia.
