= Acrolepia nothocestri =

Scientific classification
- Kingdom: Animalia
- Phylum: Arthropoda
- Class: Insecta
- Order: Lepidoptera
- Family: Acrolepiidae
- Genus: Acrolepia
- Species: A. nothocestri

Binomial name
- Acrolepia nothocestri Busck, 1914

Species of moth

Acrolepia nothocestri is a moth of the family Acrolepiidae. It was first described by August Busck in 1914. It is endemic to the Hawaiian island of Oahu.

The larvae feed on Nothocestrum longifolium. They mine the leaves of their host plant.
