= Acrolepiopsis infundibulosa =

Scientific classification
- Domain: Eukaryota
- Kingdom: Animalia
- Phylum: Arthropoda
- Class: Insecta
- Order: Lepidoptera
- Family: Acrolepiidae
- Genus: Acrolepiopsis
- Species: A. infundibulosa

Binomial name
- Acrolepiopsis infundibulosa Gaedike & Karsholt, 2001

Species of moth

Acrolepiopsis infundibulosa is a moth of the family Acrolepiidae that is endemic to Madeira.
