= Acrolepiopsis sinense =

Scientific classification
- Kingdom: Animalia
- Phylum: Arthropoda
- Clade: Pancrustacea
- Class: Insecta
- Order: Lepidoptera
- Family: Acrolepiidae
- Genus: Acrolepiopsis
- Species: A. sinense

Binomial name
- Acrolepiopsis sinense Gaedike, 1971

Synonyms
- Acrolepia sinense

Species of moth

Acrolepiopsis sinense is a moth of the family Acrolepiidae. It is found in China (Zhejiang).
