= Acrolepia rungsella =

Scientific classification
- Kingdom: Animalia
- Phylum: Arthropoda
- Class: Insecta
- Order: Lepidoptera
- Family: Acrolepiidae
- Genus: Acrolepia
- Species: A. rungsella

Binomial name
- Acrolepia rungsella D. Lucas, 1943

Species of moth

Acrolepia rungsella is a moth of the family Acrolepiidae. It was described by Daniel Lucas in 1943. It is found in Morocco.
