= Acrolepia tharsalea =

Scientific classification
- Kingdom: Animalia
- Phylum: Arthropoda
- Class: Insecta
- Order: Lepidoptera
- Family: Acrolepiidae
- Genus: Acrolepia
- Species: A. tharsalea

Binomial name
- Acrolepia tharsalea Walsingham, 1914

Species of moth

Acrolepia tharsalea is a moth of the family Acrolepiidae. It was described by Walsingham in 1914. It is found in Guatemala.
