= Acrolepiopsis nagaimo =

Scientific classification
- Kingdom: Animalia
- Phylum: Arthropoda
- Clade: Pancrustacea
- Class: Insecta
- Order: Lepidoptera
- Family: Acrolepiidae
- Genus: Acrolepiopsis
- Species: A. nagaimo

Binomial name
- Acrolepiopsis nagaimo Yasuda, 2000

Species of moth

Acrolepiopsis nagaimo is a moth of the family Acrolepiidae. It was described by Yasuda in 2000. It is found in Japan.

The larvae feed on Dioscorea oposita. They mine the leaves of their host plant.
