= Acrolepiopsis kostjuki =

Scientific classification
- Domain: Eukaryota
- Kingdom: Animalia
- Phylum: Arthropoda
- Class: Insecta
- Order: Lepidoptera
- Family: Acrolepiidae
- Genus: Acrolepiopsis
- Species: A. kostjuki

Binomial name
- Acrolepiopsis kostjuki Budashkin, 1998

Synonyms
- Acrolepia kostjuki

Species of moth

Acrolepiopsis kostjuki is a moth of the family Acrolepiidae. It is found in China (Shaanxi, Tianjin), Mongolia and Russia (Amurskaya oblast, Zabaykalye).

The larvae feed on Ziziphus jujuba.
