= Acrolepia nitrodes =

Scientific classification
- Kingdom: Animalia
- Phylum: Arthropoda
- Class: Insecta
- Order: Lepidoptera
- Family: Acrolepiidae
- Genus: Acrolepia
- Species: A. nitrodes

Binomial name
- Acrolepia nitrodes Meyrick, 1910

Species of moth

Acrolepia nitrodes is a moth of the family Acrolepiidae. It was described by Edward Meyrick in 1910. It is found in Bengal.
