= Acrolepiopsis halosticta =

Scientific classification
- Kingdom: Animalia
- Phylum: Arthropoda
- Class: Insecta
- Order: Lepidoptera
- Family: Acrolepiidae
- Genus: Acrolepiopsis
- Species: A. halosticta

Binomial name
- Acrolepiopsis halosticta (Meyrick, 1914)

Synonyms
- Acrolepia halosticta Meyrick, 1914

Species of moth

Acrolepiopsis halosticta is a moth of the family Acrolepiidae. It was described by Edward Meyrick in 1914. It is found in Africa (Nyassaland, Ruo Valley).
