= Acrolepia dioscoreivora =

Scientific classification
- Kingdom: Animalia
- Phylum: Arthropoda
- Clade: Pancrustacea
- Class: Insecta
- Order: Lepidoptera
- Family: Acrolepiidae
- Genus: Acrolepia
- Species: A. dioscoreivora

Binomial name
- Acrolepia dioscoreivora Gibeaux, 1989

Species of moth

Acrolepia dioscoreivora is a moth of the family Acrolepiidae. It is known from Africa.
