= Acrolepiopsis orchidophaga =

Scientific classification
- Kingdom: Animalia
- Phylum: Arthropoda
- Class: Insecta
- Order: Lepidoptera
- Family: Acrolepiidae
- Genus: Acrolepiopsis
- Species: A. orchidophaga

Binomial name
- Acrolepiopsis orchidophaga (Moriuti, 1982)

Synonyms
- Acrolepia orchidophaga Moriuti, 1982

Species of moth

Acrolepiopsis orchidophaga is a moth of the family Acrolepiidae. It was described by Sigeru Moriuti in 1982. It is found in Japan.

The wingspan is 8.5–10 mm.
