= Acrolepiopsis ussurica =

Scientific classification
- Domain: Eukaryota
- Kingdom: Animalia
- Phylum: Arthropoda
- Class: Insecta
- Order: Lepidoptera
- Family: Acrolepiidae
- Genus: Acrolepiopsis
- Species: A. ussurica

Binomial name
- Acrolepiopsis ussurica Zagulajev, 1981

Synonyms
- Acrolepia ussurica

Species of moth

Acrolepiopsis ussurica is a moth of the family Acrolepiidae. It is found in China (Tianjin) and Russia (Primorskiy kray, Amurskaya oblast).
