= Acrolepia aiea =

Scientific classification
- Kingdom: Animalia
- Phylum: Arthropoda
- Class: Insecta
- Order: Lepidoptera
- Family: Acrolepiidae
- Genus: Acrolepia
- Species: A. aiea

Binomial name
- Acrolepia aiea Swezey, 1933

Species of moth

Acrolepia aiea is a moth of the family Acrolepiidae. It was first described by Otto Herman Swezey in 1833 and is endemic to the Hawaiian island of Kauai.

The larvae feed on Nothocestrum latifolium. They mine the leaves of their host plant.
