= Acrolepiopsis reticulosa =

Scientific classification
- Domain: Eukaryota
- Kingdom: Animalia
- Phylum: Arthropoda
- Class: Insecta
- Order: Lepidoptera
- Family: Acrolepiidae
- Genus: Acrolepiopsis
- Species: A. reticulosa

Binomial name
- Acrolepiopsis reticulosa (Braun, 1927)

Synonyms
- Acrolepia reticulosa Braun, 1927

Species of moth

Acrolepiopsis reticulosa is a moth of the family Acrolepiidae. It is only known from two widely separated locations in Wyoming and New Mexico.

The length of the forewings 7.3–8.6 mm.
