= Acrolepiopsis chirapanthui =

Scientific classification
- Kingdom: Animalia
- Phylum: Arthropoda
- Clade: Pancrustacea
- Class: Insecta
- Order: Lepidoptera
- Family: Acrolepiidae
- Genus: Acrolepiopsis
- Species: A. chirapanthui

Binomial name
- Acrolepiopsis chirapanthui (Moriuti, 1984)

Synonyms
- Acrolepia chirapanthui Moriuti, 1984

Species of moth

Acrolepiopsis chirapanthui is a moth of the family Acrolepiidae. It was described by Sigeru Moriuti in 1984. It is found in Thailand (the Chiang Mai Province).

The wingspan is about 9 mm. The forewings are brownish-ochreous with scattered black and whitish scales. The hindwings are pale, becoming paler towards the base.
