= Acrolepia oxyglypta =

Scientific classification
- Kingdom: Animalia
- Phylum: Arthropoda
- Class: Insecta
- Order: Lepidoptera
- Family: Acrolepiidae
- Genus: Acrolepia
- Species: A. oxyglypta

Binomial name
- Acrolepia oxyglypta Meyrick, 1929

Species of moth

Acrolepia oxyglypta is a moth of the family Acrolepiidae. It was described by Edward Meyrick in 1929. It is found in Panama.
