= Acrolepia poliopis =

Scientific classification
- Kingdom: Animalia
- Phylum: Arthropoda
- Class: Insecta
- Order: Lepidoptera
- Family: Acrolepiidae
- Genus: Acrolepia
- Species: A. poliopis

Binomial name
- Acrolepia poliopis Meyrick, 1919

Species of moth

Acrolepia poliopis is a moth of the family Acrolepiidae. It was described by Edward Meyrick in 1919. It is found in South America.
