= Acrolepiopsis peterseni =

Scientific classification
- Kingdom: Animalia
- Phylum: Arthropoda
- Clade: Pancrustacea
- Class: Insecta
- Order: Lepidoptera
- Family: Acrolepiidae
- Genus: Acrolepiopsis
- Species: A. peterseni

Binomial name
- Acrolepiopsis peterseni Gaedike, 1994

Species of moth

Acrolepiopsis peterseni is a moth of the family Acrolepiidae. It was described by Reinhard Gaedike in 1994. It is found in Russia (it was described from the area of Ussuriysk in Primorsky Krai).
