= Acrolepia nodulata =

Scientific classification
- Kingdom: Animalia
- Phylum: Arthropoda
- Class: Insecta
- Order: Lepidoptera
- Family: Acrolepiidae
- Genus: Acrolepia
- Species: A. nodulata

Binomial name
- Acrolepia nodulata Meyrick, 1921

Species of moth

Acrolepia nodulata is a moth of the family Acrolepiidae. It was described by Edward Meyrick in 1921. It is found in India (Assam).
