= Antispastis clarkei =

Scientific classification
- Kingdom: Animalia
- Phylum: Arthropoda
- Clade: Pancrustacea
- Class: Insecta
- Order: Lepidoptera
- Family: Glyphipterigidae
- Genus: Antispastis
- Species: A. clarkei

Binomial name
- Antispastis clarkei Pastrana, 1952

Species of moth

Antispastis clarkei is a species of moth in the family Glyphipterigidae. It is found in South America and was redescribed to clarify its diagnostic features, including wing venation and genitalia structures.

The species is primarily distinguished by its external morphology and male and female genitalia, which were documented in detail in the redescription. Collection records indicate that it occurs in forests in Chile, Argentina and Brazil.
