= Acrolepia rejecta =

Scientific classification
- Kingdom: Animalia
- Phylum: Arthropoda
- Class: Insecta
- Order: Lepidoptera
- Family: Acrolepiidae
- Genus: Acrolepia
- Species: A. rejecta

Binomial name
- Acrolepia rejecta Meyrick, 1922

Species of moth

Acrolepia rejecta is a moth of the family Acrolepiidae. It was described by Edward Meyrick in 1922. It is found in China.
