= Digitivalvopsis =

Scientific classification
- Kingdom: Animalia
- Phylum: Arthropoda
- Class: Insecta
- Order: Lepidoptera
- Family: Acrolepiidae
- Genus: Digitivalvopsis; Budashkin, 1993
- Species: D. paradoxa

Binomial name
- Digitivalvopsis paradoxa (Moriuti, 1982)

Synonyms
- Acrolepia paradoxa Moriuti, 1982

Genus of moths

Digitivalvopsis paradoxa is a moth of the family Acrolepiidae. It was described by Sigeru Moriuti in 1982. It is found in Japan and the Russian Far East.

The wingspan is about 10 mm.
