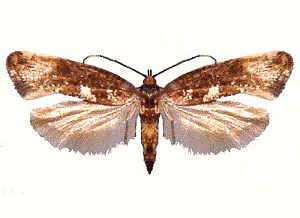
- Acrolepiopsis assectella

Scientific classification
- Kingdom: Animalia
- Phylum: Arthropoda
- Clade: Pancrustacea
- Class: Insecta
- Order: Lepidoptera
- Family: Acrolepiidae
- Genus: Acrolepiopsis; Gaedike, 1970

Species
- See text

Synonyms
- Argiope Chambers, 1873

= Acrolepiopsis =

Genus of moths

Acrolepiopsis is a genus of moths in the family Acrolepiidae.

== Species ==
The following species are classified:

- Acrolepiopsis assectella Zeller, 1839
- Acrolepiopsis betulella Curtis, 1838
- Acrolepiopsis brevipennella (Moriuti, 1972)
- Acrolepiopsis californica Gaedike, 1984
- Acrolepiopsis chirapanthui (Moriuti, 1984)
- Acrolepiopsis clavivalvatella Moriuti, 1972
- Acrolepiopsis delta (Moriuti, 1961)
- Acrolepiopsis deltoides Gaedike, 1971
- Acrolepiopsis halosticta (Meyrick, 1914)
- Acrolepiopsis heppneri Gaedike, 1984
- Acrolepiopsis incertella (Chambers, 1872)
- Acrolepiopsis infundibulosa Gaedike & Karsholt, 2001
- Acrolepiopsis issikiella (Moriuti, 1961)
- Acrolepiopsis japonica Gaedike, 1982
- Acrolepiopsis kostjuki Budashkin, 1998
- Acrolepiopsis leucoscia (Meyrick, 1927)
- Acrolepiopsis marcidella Curtis, 1850
- Acrolepiopsis mauli Gaedike & Karsholt, 2001
- Acrolepiopsis nagaimo Yasuda, 2000
- Acrolepiopsis orchidophaga Moriuti, 1982
- Acrolepiopsis persimilis Moriuti, 1974
- Acrolepiopsis peterseni Gaedike, 1994
- Acrolepiopsis postomacula (Matsumura, 1931)
- Acrolepiopsis reticulosa (Braun, 1927)
- Acrolepiopsis sapporensis Matsumura, 1931
- Acrolepiopsis sinense Gaedike, 1971
- Acrolepiopsis sinjovi Gaedike, 1994
- Acrolepiopsis suzukiella (Matsumura, 1931)
- Acrolepiopsis tauricella Staudinger, 1871
- Acrolepiopsis ussurica Zagulajev, 1981
- Acrolepiopsis vesperella Zeller, 1850
