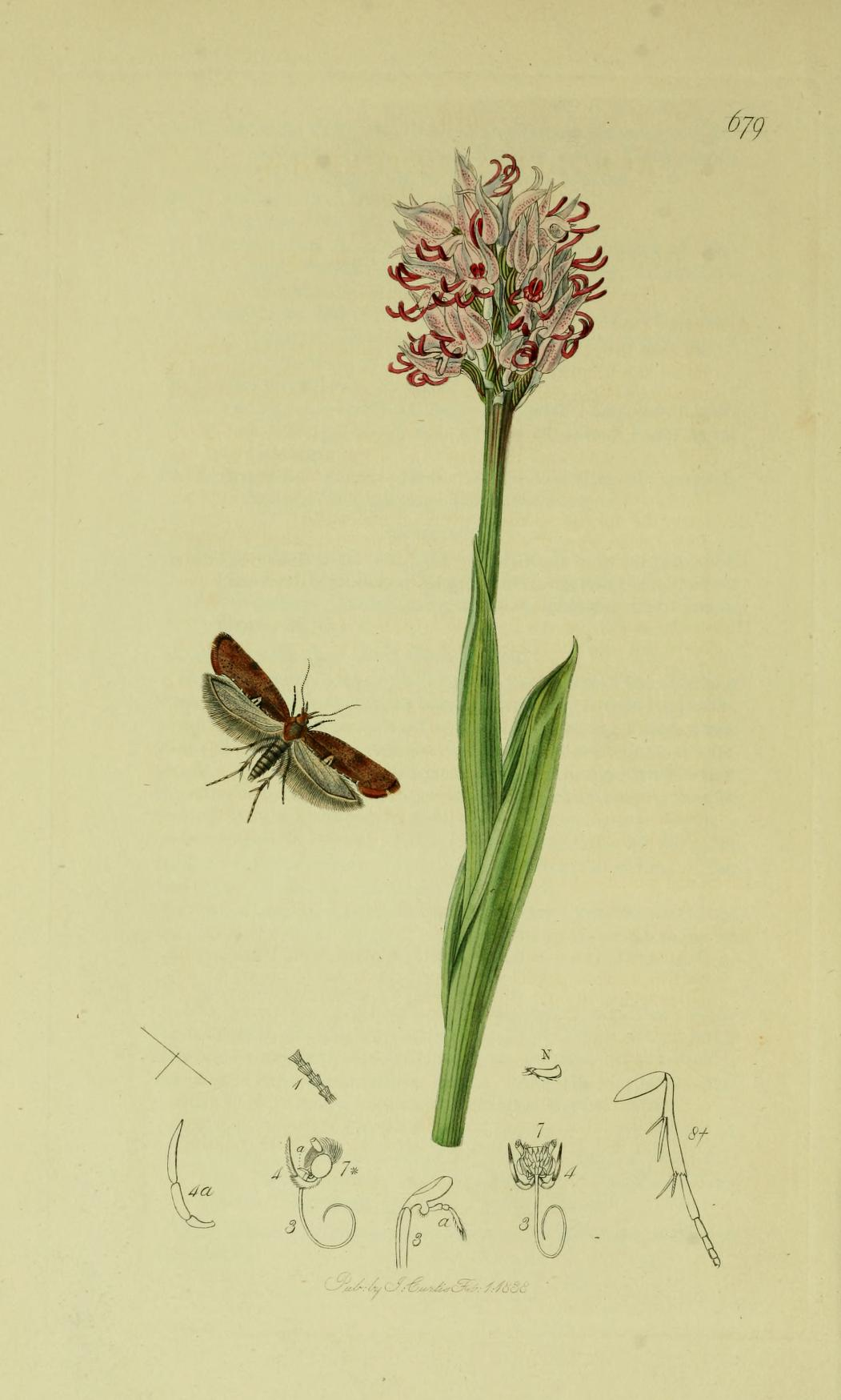
- Illustration from John Curtis's British Entomology Volume 6

Scientific classification
- Domain: Eukaryota
- Kingdom: Animalia
- Phylum: Arthropoda
- Class: Insecta
- Order: Lepidoptera
- Family: Acrolepiidae
- Genus: Acrolepiopsis
- Species: A. betulella

Binomial name
- Acrolepiopsis betulella Curtis, 1838

Synonyms
- Acrolepia betulella Curtis, 1838; Roeslerstammia betuletella Stainton, 1849; Acrolepia unicolor Wocke, 1884; Acrolepia ursinella Weber, 1845; Acrolepia albimaculella Weber, 1845; Acrolepia parvisignata Weber, 1945

= Acrolepiopsis betulella =

Species of moth

Acrolepiopsis betulella (Durham tinea) is a moth of the family Acrolepiidae. It is found in most of central and western Europe. It was believed to be extinct in Great Britain, with 19th-century records from damp woodland in County Durham and Yorkshire and 20th-century records from Scotland, until a specimen was captured in County Durham in spring 2012.

The wingspan is 12–14 mm. Adults are on wing in July. There is one generation per year.

The larvae feed within flowers and seedheads of Allium ursinum.
