= Diadromus pulchellus =

Scientific classification
- Domain: Eukaryota
- Kingdom: Animalia
- Phylum: Arthropoda
- Class: Insecta
- Order: Hymenoptera
- Family: Ichneumonidae
- Genus: Diadromus
- Species: D. pulchellus

Binomial name
- Diadromus pulchellus Wesmael, 1845

Species of insect

Diadromus pulchellus is a species of parasitoid wasp in the family Ichneumonidae. Its host is the leek moth, Acrolepiopsis assectella.
