= Acrolepiopsis marcidella =

Scientific classification
- Domain: Eukaryota
- Kingdom: Animalia
- Phylum: Arthropoda
- Class: Insecta
- Order: Lepidoptera
- Family: Acrolepiidae
- Genus: Acrolepiopsis
- Species: A. marcidella

Binomial name
- Acrolepiopsis marcidella (Curtis, 1850)

Synonyms
- Acrolepia marcidella Curtis, 1850; Roeslerstammia fumociliella Mann, 1855

Species of moth

Acrolepiopsis marcidella is a moth of the family Acrolepiidae. It is found in Great Britain, France, Spain, Portugal, Switzerland, Italy, Croatia and Bulgaria.

The wingspan is 13–15 mm. Adults are on wing in June and July.

The larvae feed on butcher's broom (Ruscus aculeatus), mining the fruit.
