= Acrolepiopsis tauricella =

Scientific classification
- Domain: Eukaryota
- Kingdom: Animalia
- Phylum: Arthropoda
- Class: Insecta
- Order: Lepidoptera
- Family: Acrolepiidae
- Genus: Acrolepiopsis
- Species: A. tauricella

Binomial name
- Acrolepiopsis tauricella (Staudinger, 1870)

Synonyms
- Acrolepia tauricella Staudinger, 1870; Acrolepia karolyii Szocs, 1969; Acrolepia similella Muller-Rutz, 1920

Species of moth

Acrolepiopsis tauricella is a moth of the family Acrolepiidae. It is found Italy, Switzerland, Hungary and Ukraine.

The larvae feed on Tamus communis. They mine the leaves of their host plant. Young larvae make one or two small full depth blotch mines. The larvae have a pale yellowish green body and head.
