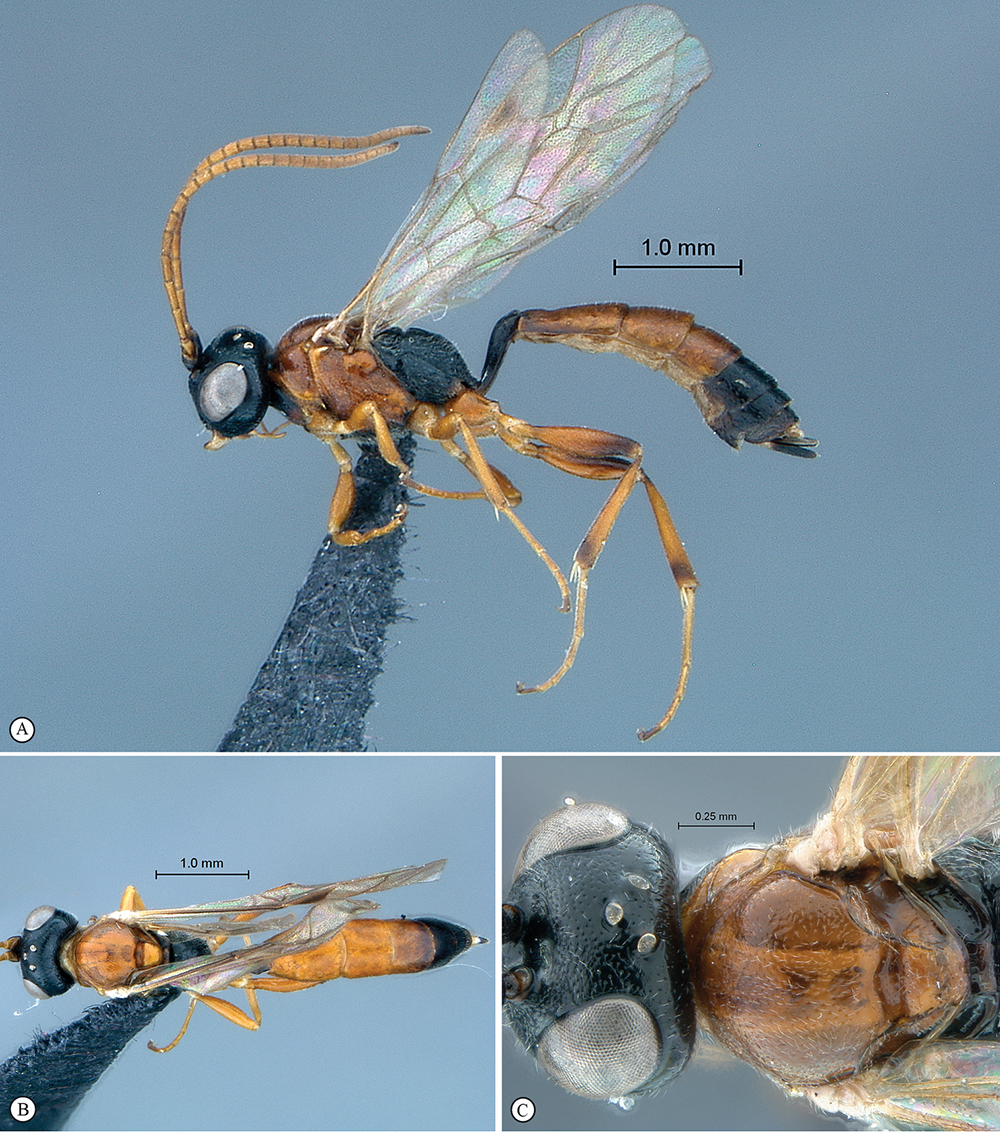
- Diadromus collaris

Scientific classification
- Kingdom: Animalia
- Phylum: Arthropoda
- Class: Insecta
- Order: Hymenoptera
- Family: Ichneumonidae
- Genus: Diadromus; Wesmael, 1845

= Diadromus =

Genus of parasitoid wasps

Diadromus is a genus of parasitoid wasps belonging to the family Ichneumonidae.

The species of this genus are found in Europe and North America.

There are over two dozen species in this genus, including:

- Diadromus albiceps Strobl, 1901
- Diadromus albinotatus (Gravenhorst, 1829)
- Diadromus collaris (Gravenhorst, 1829)
- Diadromus pulchellus
- Diadromus nitidigaster
