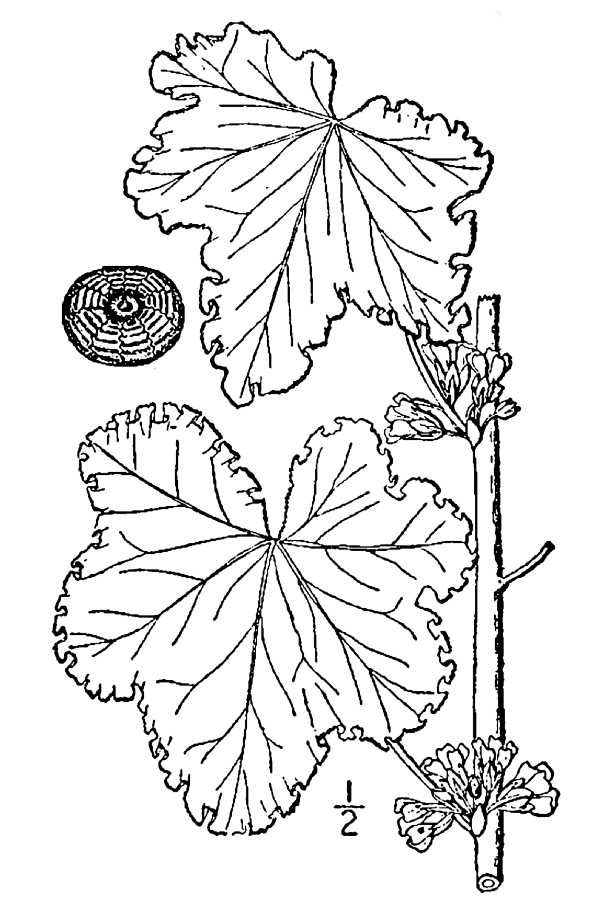
- Illustration of the leaves and seeds of M. verticillata

Scientific classification
- Kingdom: Plantae
- Clade: Tracheophytes
- Clade: Angiosperms
- Clade: Eudicots
- Clade: Rosids
- Order: Malvales
- Family: Malvaceae
- Genus: Malva
- Species: M. verticillata

Binomial name
- Malva verticillata L.

Varieties
- M. verticillata var. rafiqii; M. verticillata var. verticillata

Synonyms
- List: Althaea crispa (L.) Alef.; Althaea verticillata (L.) Alef.; Malva abyssinica A.Braun; Malva alchemillifolia Wall.; Malva brevifolia Gilib.; Malva chinensis Mill.; Malva crispa (L.) L.; Malva glomerata G.Don; Malva hybrida Steud.; Malva meluca Graebn. ex Medw.; Malva mohileviensis Downar; Malva montana Forssk.; Malva neilgherrensis Wight; Malva nepalensis Steud.; Malva olitoria Nakata; Malva pulchella Colla; Malva pulchella Bernh.

= Malva verticillata =

Plant species in the mallow family

Malva verticillata, also known as the Chinese mallow or cluster mallow, is a species of the mallow genus Malva in the family of Malvaceae found in East Asia from Pakistan to China. M. verticillata is an annual or biennial that grow up to 1.7 meters in high and can inhabit woodland areas of different soil types. The small, symmetrical flowers have five white, pink or red petals (0.8 cm) and thirteen or more stamens. Each flower has three narrow epicalyx bracts. The fruit is a dry, hairless nutlet. The leaves are simple and alternate.

In temperate climates, it flowers from July to September and the seeds from August to October. The flowers of the plant are self-fertile but can also be pollinated by insects.

== Distribution ==
The species originates in Asia. It is widely distributed in Europe and is considered an invasive plant. It is also present in North America, including most states in the USA.

== Uses ==
The plant was an important leaf vegetable in pre-Han China and widely cultivated. Mallow is mentioned in Huangdi Neijing as one of the five consumable herbs (五菜) which included mallow (葵), pea leaves (藿), Allium macrostemon (薤), Welsh onion (蔥) and Garlic chives (韭). It is mentioned in the Zuo Zhuan in Duke Cheng's reign by Confucius to compare to the head of the Bao clan saying he is not as smart as a kuicai (mallow) because it keeps its roots to the ground. It was deemed to be a major vegetable until the Northern Wei, supposedly. The technology for domesticating mallow was well recorded in Qimin Yaoshu. The acreages dwindled since the Tang dynasty. In his Nong Shu [Agricultural Manual], Wang Zhen wrote that mallow came top among various vegetables, because "it could be alternative in years of crop failure, or be marinated to serve with staples". There were rare occasions that people cultivated or consumed mallow during the Ming dynasty.

It is also grown as an ornamental plant.

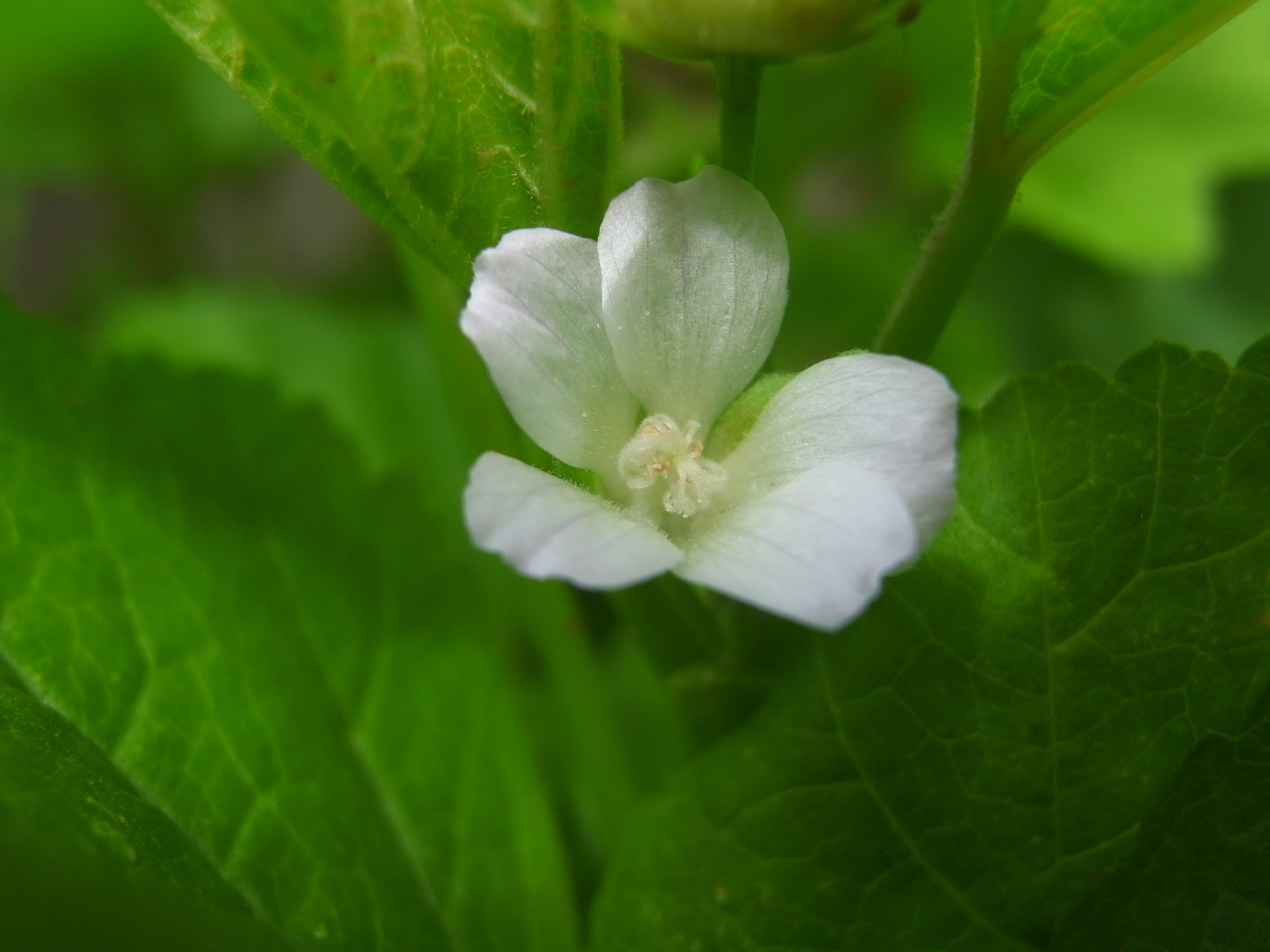
M. verticillata flower

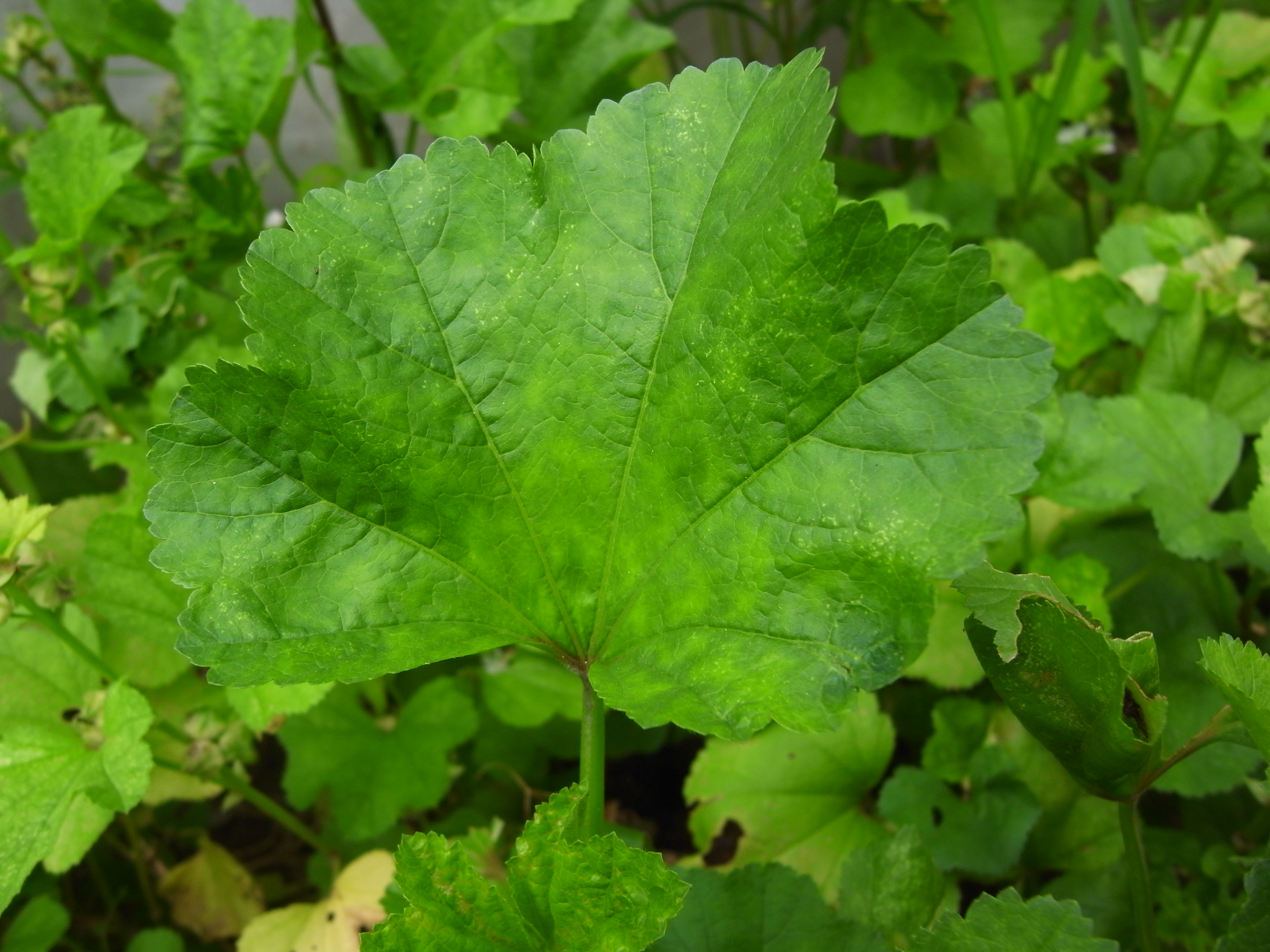
M. verticillata leaves

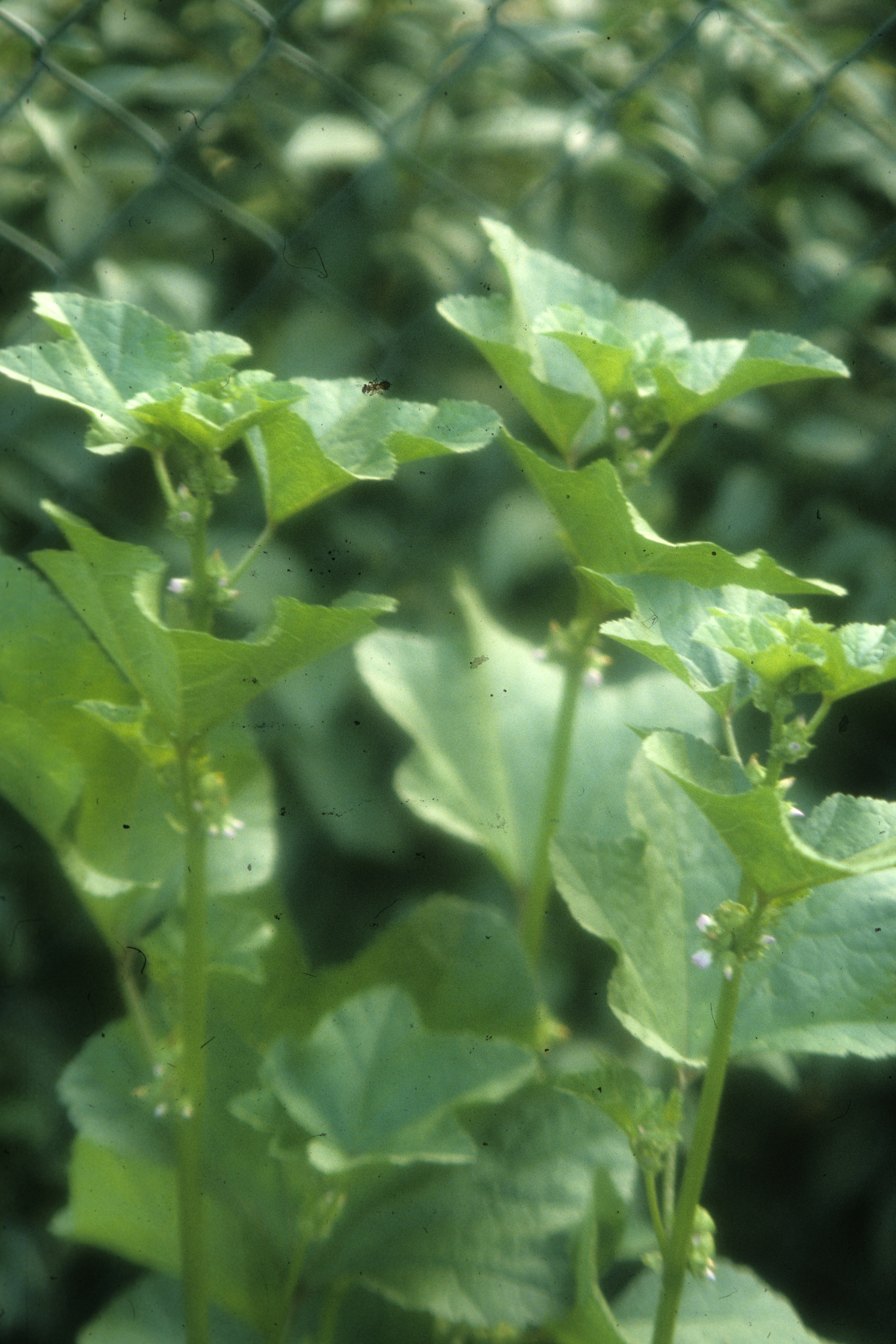
M. verticillata aerial portions
