= Acrolepiopsis vesperella =

Scientific classification
- Kingdom: Animalia
- Phylum: Arthropoda
- Clade: Pancrustacea
- Class: Insecta
- Order: Lepidoptera
- Family: Acrolepiidae
- Genus: Acrolepiopsis
- Species: A. vesperella

Binomial name
- Acrolepiopsis vesperella (Zeller, 1850)

Synonyms
- Roeslerstammia vesperella Zeller, 1850; Acrolepia smilaxella Milliere, 1874; Acrolepia tami Hering, 1927; Acrolepia tamias

Species of moth

Acrolepiopsis vesperella is a moth of the family Acrolepiidae. It is found in Germany, France, Spain, Portugal, Italy, Croatia, Serbia and Montenegro, Greece and on the Canary Islands. The larvae have a pale yellowish green body and head. They can be found in March.
