= Acrolepiopsis incertella =

Scientific classification
- Kingdom: Animalia
- Phylum: Arthropoda
- Clade: Pancrustacea
- Class: Insecta
- Order: Lepidoptera
- Family: Acrolepiidae
- Genus: Acrolepiopsis
- Species: A. incertella

Binomial name
- Acrolepiopsis incertella (Chambers, 1872)

Synonyms
- Heribeia incertella Chambers, 1872; Acrolepia incertella; Agriope dorsimaculella Chambers, 1873

Species of moth

Acrolepiopsis incertella is a moth of the family Acrolepiidae. It is found in the eastern half of North America, from southern Ontario to Florida and Mississippi in the south and to Illinois and Michigan in the west.

The length of the forewings 4.3–6 mm.
