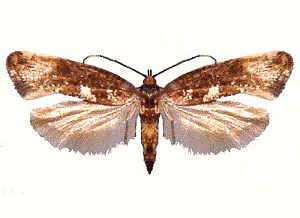

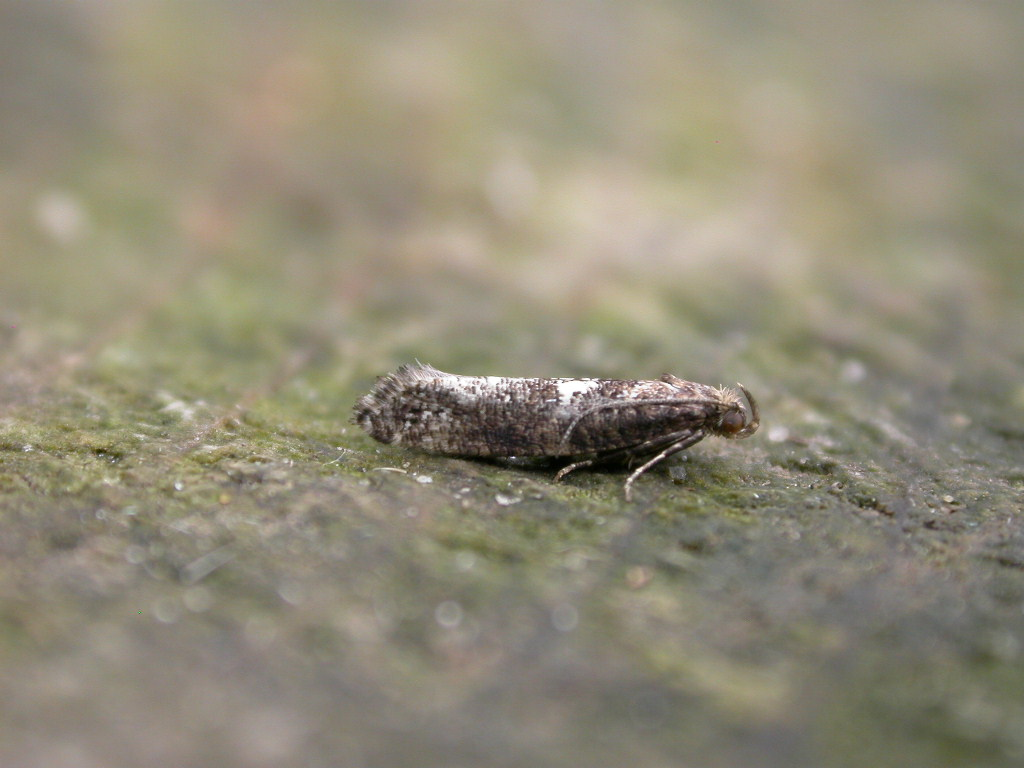

Scientific classification
- Kingdom: Animalia
- Phylum: Arthropoda
- Class: Insecta
- Order: Lepidoptera
- Family: Acrolepiidae
- Genus: Acrolepiopsis
- Species: A. assectella

Binomial name
- Acrolepiopsis assectella (Zeller, 1839)

Synonyms
- Roeslerstammia assectella Zeller, 1839; Acrolepia assectella; Digitivalva assectella; Lita vigiliella Duponchel 1842; Acrolepia caucasica Zagulajev, 1980; Acrolepia obscurella Rocci, 1931

= Leek moth =

Species of moth

The leek moth or onion leaf miner (Acrolepiopsis assectella) is a species of moth of family Acrolepiidae (formerly Glyphipterigidae) and the genus Acrolepiopsis. The species is native to Europe and Siberia, but is also found in North America, where it is an invasive species. While it was initially recorded in Hawaii, this was actually a misidentification of Acrolepiopsis sapporensis.

The leek moth is similar in appearance to other members of the genus Acrolepiopsis, with mottled brown and white wings. Its wing span is approximately 12 mm across.

It is a pest of leek crops, as the larvae feed on several species of Allium by mining into the leaves or bulbs. The shape of the leaf mine is variable, ranging from a corridor to a blotch, and can be with or without frass. This leaf mining can occur in the tubular leaves or in the stem. In the case of onions and shallots, the larvae mine into the bulb. In North America, where the moth is an invasive species and has few known natural predators, the species threatens the production and biodiversity of Allium, and it has the potential to destroy entire crops. The parasitoid Diadromus pulchellus is used to control the spread of and damage caused by the leek moth in Europe and North America.

== Description ==
The wings are brown mottled with white spots and measure about 12 mm across. High individual variation in wing pattern can make the leek moth difficult to distinguish from other Acrolepiopsis species at first, but its distinct genitalia make it easily identifiable. Males of this species can be identified by their long saccus, a portion of the male genitalia used for grasping females, and females by their long and flat ductus bursae, a portion of the female reproductive tract.

== Distribution ==
The leek moth is native to Europe, where it is present throughout the entire continent. Scandinavia and Russia mark the northwestern and northeastern bounds of its range, respectively, and its presence extends to Algeria in the south. It is an invasive species in North America, where it was first discovered in Canada in 1993. It has since expanded its North American range to include parts of Ontario, Quebec, Prince Edward Island, New York, and Nova Scotia. Climate models suggest that the leek moth's range could continue to expand to encompass a larger portion of eastern North America.

== Larval host plants ==
=== Host plant selection ===
The female leek moth selects the host plant for oviposition. She is drawn to the plant through thiosulphinates, chemical attractants released by the plant. Egg-laying does not take place immediately, however; it occurs only after longer contact with the leaf, during which time another chemical signal cues oviposition. Propyl-cysteine-sulfoxide has been shown to induce egg-laying in the leek moth and could be involved in host plant selection as a characteristic signal of Allium.

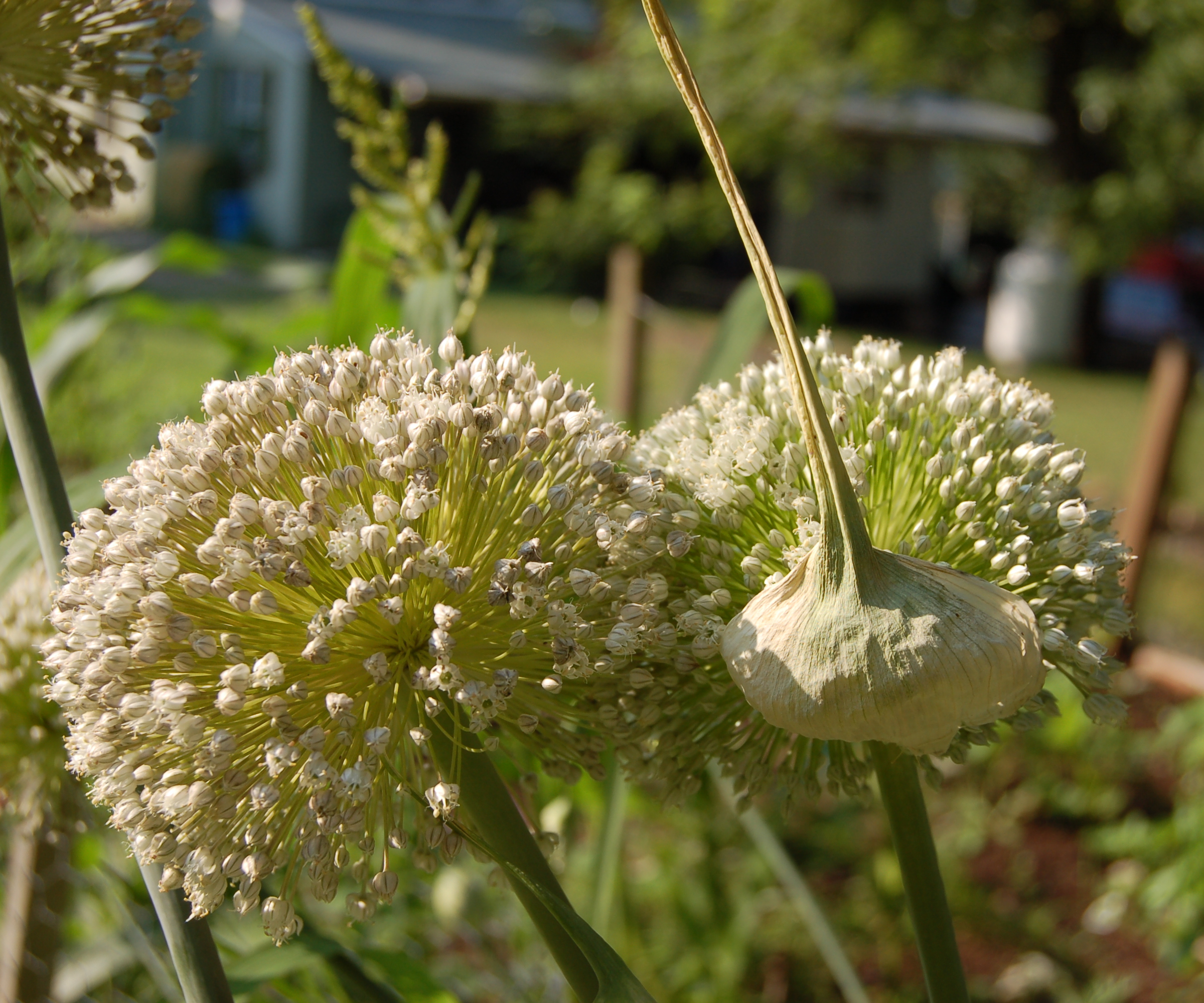
Leek, the eponymous host plant of the leek moth

=== Host plant preference ===
Larvae feed on plants of the genus Allium, including:

- Allium cepa – onion
- Allium sativum – garlic
- Allium porrum – leek
- Allium ampeloprasum – elephant garlic
- Allium cepa var. aggregatum – shallot
- Allium schoenoprasum –chive
- Allium cernuum – nodding onion
- Allium stellatum – prairie onion

The leek moth prefers A. sativum, garlic, A. porrum, leek, and A. cepa, onion, to other species of Allium.

=== Oviposition ===
Oviposition takes place in three behavioral stages: slow walking, pausing, and egg-laying. When given the choice between plants of the same species and of different sizes, females choose to lay their eggs on the larger plant.

== Life cycle ==
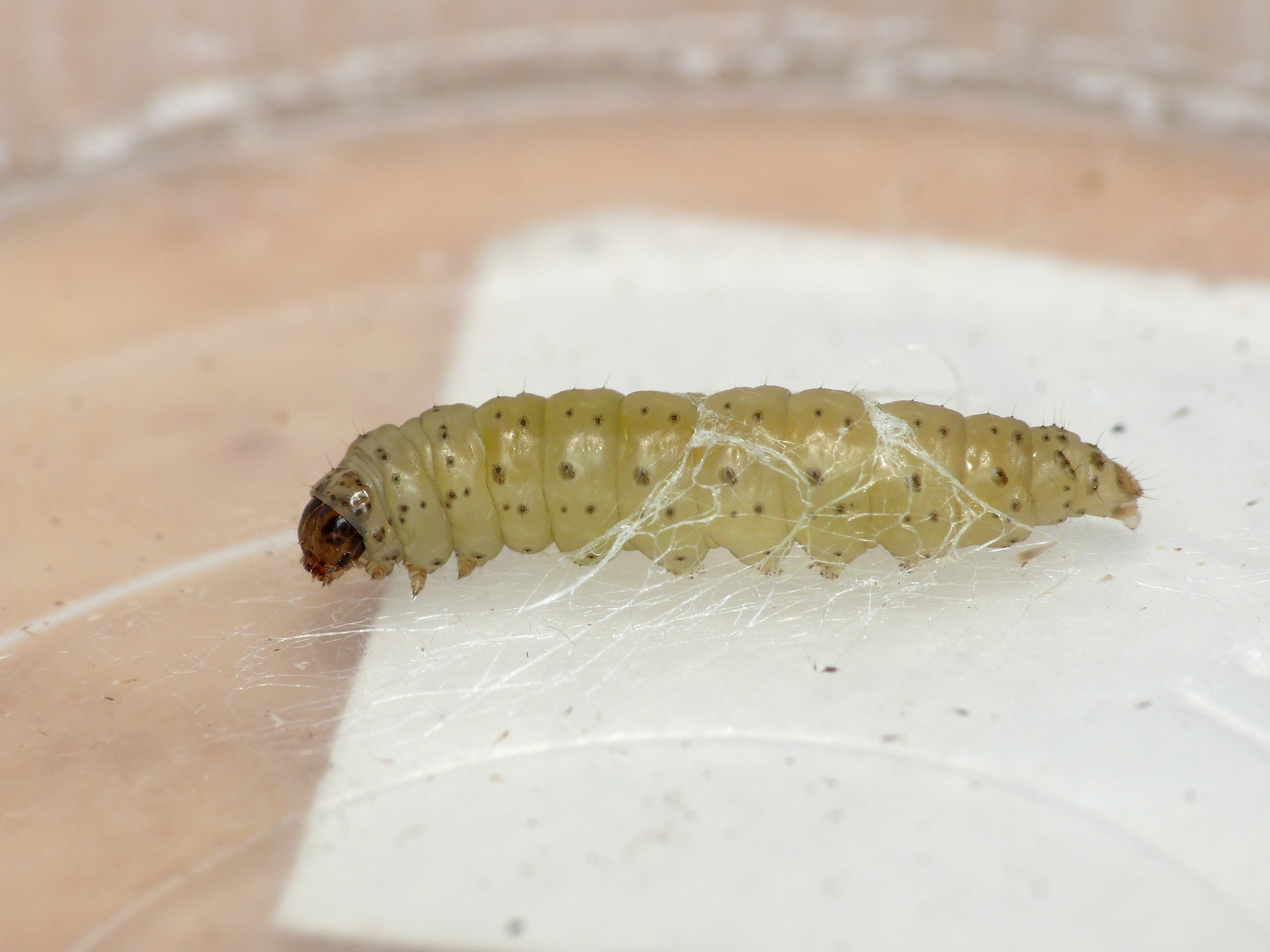
Leek moth larva

Development time from egg to adult is variable depending on temperature, generally ranging from 3 weeks at higher temperatures to 6 weeks at lower temperatures. Likewise, the number of generations possible each year depends on local climate conditions. Whereas three or more generations can typically be completed in Ontario, France, and Poland, only two can be completed in Sweden.

Adults emerge in the spring and lay eggs within 10 days of adulthood. Eggs are laid on the leaves of the larval host plant, into which first instar larvae mine and subsequently complete five instars, reaching a length of 13–14 mm when mature. Larvae are light yellow-green in color with a brownish-yellow head. After reaching maturity, fifth instar larvae emerge from the host plant and spin a cocoon, on the host plant or nearby. Cocoons are white in color, pupa reddish-brown. If daylengths during previous larval stages are shorter than 15 hours, emergent adults will enter diapause to overwinter. Otherwise, adults lay another generation of eggs.

== Predators ==
Knowledge of the leek moth's natural predators in North America is limited, but several larval and pupal parasitoids of the species have been documented in Europe. Parasitoids lay their eggs within or attached to the body of the host, the parasitoid larvae ultimately killing the host. Parasitoids are shown to parasitize the leek moth to a greater extent when leek moth populations are large and in early leek moth generations, suggesting that parasitism is less significant in smaller populations and in later generations. The leek moth is most vulnerable to parasitism in its pupal stage when it is no longer protected by the interior of its host plant.

Diadromus pulchellus, a host-specific parasitoid of the leek moth, has been introduced in the Ottawa region in Canada as a biological control method for the invasive moth.

== Mating ==
General structure of n-alkanes, the major components of male sexual pheromones

During mating, males respond to calling females with the emission of a pheromone containing n-alkanes. Males flutter their wings, which acts to volatilize the pheromone through heat generation and disturb the pheromone molecules. The pheromone acts as an aphrodisiac for the female while inhibiting the sexual behavior of other males. These compounds can be transferred to the female during mating and their sexual inhibitory effects on conspecific males favor the monogamy seen in the leek moth.

== Physiology ==
=== Flight ===
In eastern Ontario, the leek moth undergoes three flight periods each year. The first flight period peaks in mid-May and consists of overwintering adults. The second peaks in early July and consists of first generation adults. The third peaks from late July to late August and consists of second generation adults. This pattern again suggests that three generations can be completed each summer in Ontario.

=== Olfaction ===
Females rely on the olfactory detection of volatile chemoattractants in host plant selection. Experiments suggest that the diets of female leek moths reared in laboratory conditions impact sensitivity to chemoattractants. When two strains of moths were raised in the laboratory, one fed leek leaves and the other fed an artificial diet supplemented with leek powder, the former strain showed greater sensitivity to volatile leek compounds. Furthermore, the strain fed leek leaves became progressively less sensitive to volatiles each generation.

=== Diapause ===
Adults enter diapause to overwinter when daylengths during their larval stage are less than 15 hours long. This corresponds to the end of the breeding season and involves adults of the last generation of the summer. During diapause, mating and sex organ growth halt.

== Invasive species ==
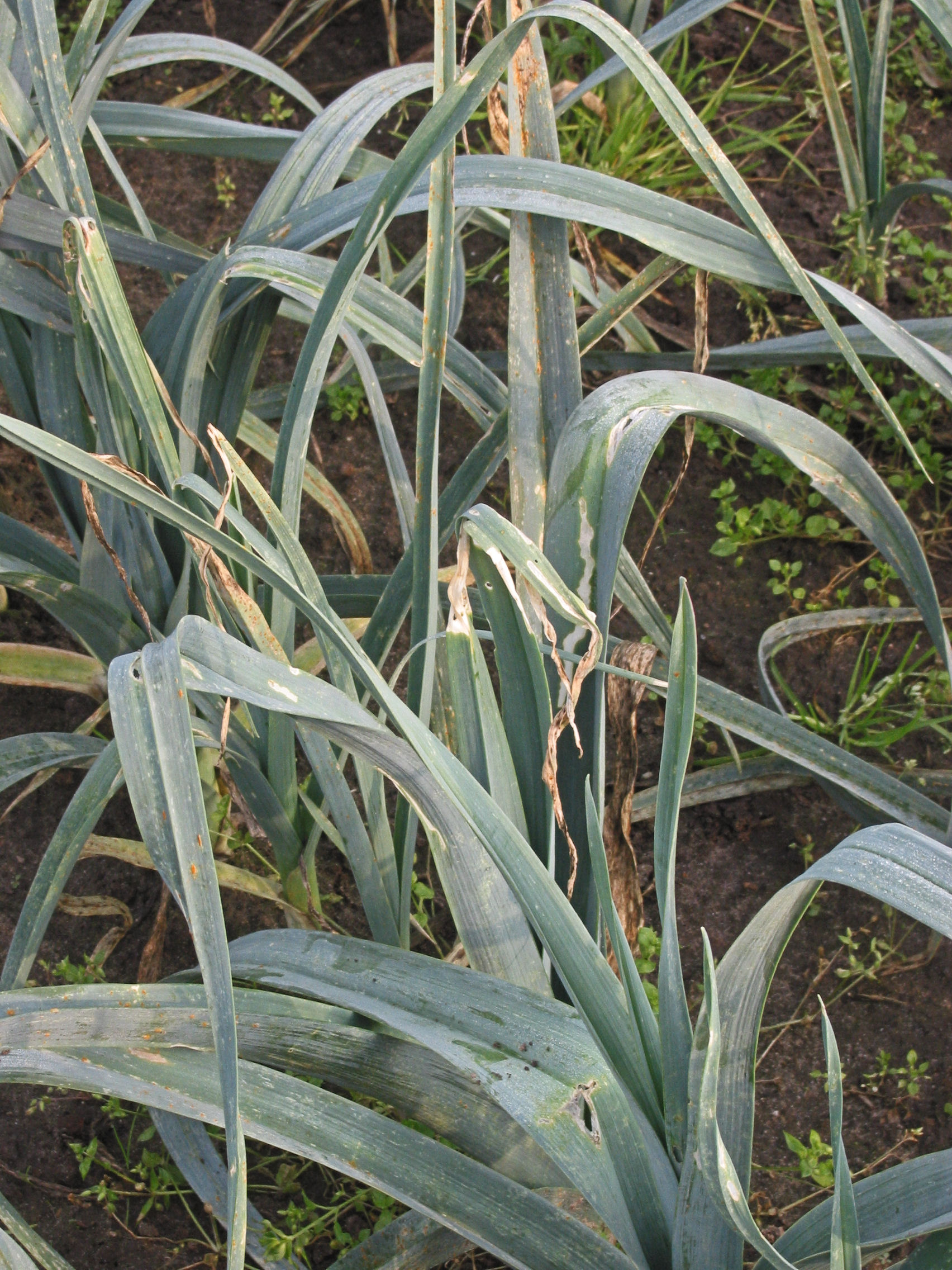
Leek moth damage to Allium porrum

The leek moth is an invasive species in North America. It was first discovered in North America in Ottawa, Canada in 1993, and was found in the United States 16 years later in Plattsburgh, New York in 2009. It has since spread throughout much of eastern North America and its range is projected to expand further into the United States and Canada. A pest of Allium crops, the leek moth poses threats both to Allium production and biodiversity. The larvae mine into the plant, reducing plant growth and causing physical damage. Organic farmers are especially vulnerable to the pest. The leek moth has few known natural predators in North America, resulting in greater pest pressure than in Europe and causing severe damage to Allium plants, sometimes resulting in the loss of entire crops.

=== Control ===
Several methods of leek moth pest control have been tested, including intercropping and trap cropping. Intercropping involves the growing of additional crops alongside the pest-susceptible crop to encourage oviposition on these additional crops. Intercropping has been found to be ineffective at controlling the spread of and damage caused by the leek moth. When trap cropping is implemented, more eggs are laid on the trap crops than on the primary crop. Research on leek moth pest control is ongoing.

== Bibliography ==
- Carter, D. (1984). Pest Lepidoptera of Europe. Dr. W. Junk Publishers, Boston.
- Gaedike R. (1969). Contribution for the knowledge of the Acrolepiidae Fauna of the Balkan Peninsula
- J.-F. Landry, "Taxonomic review of the leek moth genus Acrolepiopsis (Lepidoptera: Acrolepiidae) in North America" in Canadian entomologist.
