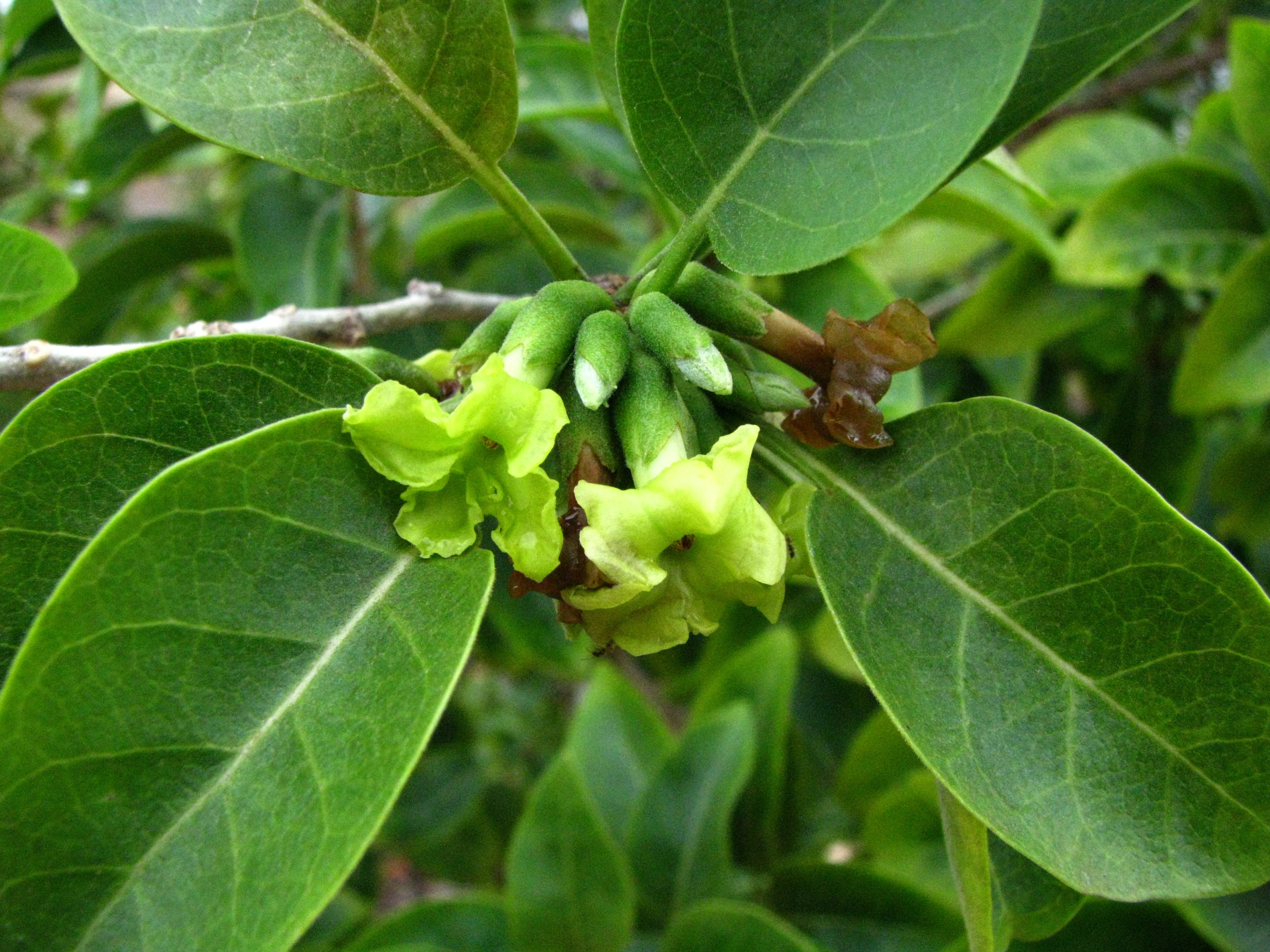

Conservation status
- Critically Endangered (IUCN 2.3)

Scientific classification
- Kingdom: Plantae
- Clade: Tracheophytes
- Clade: Angiosperms
- Clade: Eudicots
- Clade: Asterids
- Order: Solanales
- Family: Solanaceae
- Genus: Nothocestrum
- Species: N. breviflorum

Binomial name
- Nothocestrum breviflorum A.Gray

= Nothocestrum breviflorum =

Smallflower ʻaiea

Species of tree

Nothocestrum breviflorum, commonly known as smallflower ʻaiea, is a species of tree in the nightshade family, Solanaceae, that is endemic to the island of Hawaiʻi. It inhabits dry and mixed mesic forests at elevations of 180–1,830 m (590–6,000 ft). These forests are dominated by ʻōhiʻa lehua (Metrosideros polymorpha) and koa (Acacia koa) or lama (Diospyros sandwicensis), while plants associated with smallflower ʻaiea include wiliwili (Erythrina sandwicensis) and uhiuhi (Caesalpinia kavaiensis). N. breviflorum reaches a height of 10–12 m (33–39 ft). It is threatened by habitat loss. It is federally listed as an endangered species of the United States. There are fewer than 50 individuals remaining.
