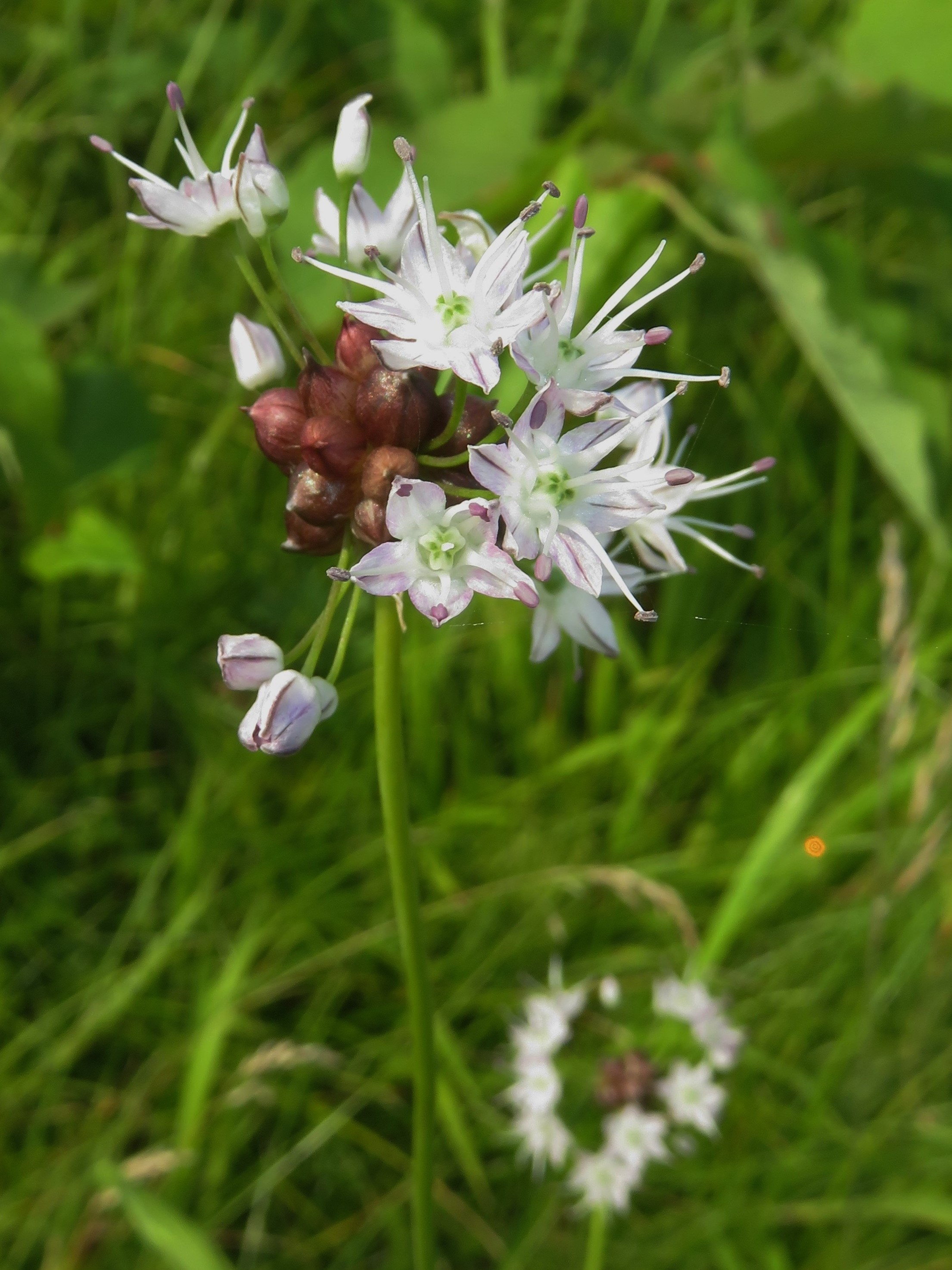
- Allium macrostemon, Tanesashi Coast, Aomori Prefecture, Japan

Conservation status
- Least Concern (IUCN 3.1)

Scientific classification
- Kingdom: Plantae
- Clade: Tracheophytes
- Clade: Angiosperms
- Clade: Monocots
- Order: Asparagales
- Family: Amaryllidaceae
- Subfamily: Allioideae
- Genus: Allium
- Subgenus: A. subg. Allium
- Species: A. macrostemon

Binomial name
- Allium macrostemon Bunge

Synonyms
- Allium chanetii H.Lév.; Allium grayi Regel; Allium grayi var. chanetii (H. Lév.) H. Lév.; Allium macrostemon var. uratense (Franch.) Airy Shaw; Allium nereidum Hance; Allium nipponicum Franch. & Sav.; Allium ousensanense Nakai; Allium iatasen H.Lév.; Allium pallasii var. uratense (Franch.) Regel; Allium uratense Franch.

= Allium macrostemon =

Long-stamen chive

Species of wild onion widespread across much of East Asia

Allium macrostemon (野蒜, ノビル), Japanese wild onion, Spring onion, Green onion, Chinese garlic, Japanese garlic or long-stamen onion, is a species of wild onion widespread across much of East Asia. It is known from many parts of China, as well as Japan (incl Ryukyu Islands), Korea, Mongolia, Tibet and Primorye. It has been collected from elevations ranging from sea level to 3000 m.

Allium macrostemon produces one round bulb up to 2 cm in diameter. Scape is up to 70 cm tall. Leaves are shorter than the scape, long and hollow, round or triangular in cross-section. Umbel is large and crowded with many pale red or pale purple flowers.

Allium macrostemon is mentioned in Huangdi Neijing as one of the five consumable herbs (五菜) which included mallow (Malva verticillata) (葵), pea leaves (藿), Welsh onion (蔥) and garlic chives (韭).
