= Digitivalva granitella =

Scientific classification
- Domain: Eukaryota
- Kingdom: Animalia
- Phylum: Arthropoda
- Class: Insecta
- Order: Lepidoptera
- Family: Acrolepiidae
- Genus: Digitivalva
- Species: D. granitella

Binomial name
- Digitivalva granitella (Treitschke, 1833)

Synonyms
- Tinea granitella Treitschke, 1833; Acrolepia granitella; Inuliphila granitella; Acrolepia variella Muller-Rutz, 1920

Species of moth

Digitivalva granitella is a moth of the family Acrolepiidae. It is found in most of Continental Europe, except Fennoscandia, the Netherlands, Portugal, the Baltic region, the western part of the Balkan Peninsula and Ukraine.

The wingspan is 11–14 mm. Adults are on wing from June to July and again from August to September in two generations per year. The adult overwinters and reappears the following spring.

The larvae feed on Inula conyza. They mine the leaves of their host plant. Pupation takes place outside of the mine. Larvae can be found from April to May and again from June to July.
