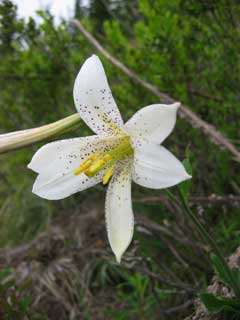

Scientific classification
- Kingdom: Plantae
- Clade: Tracheophytes
- Clade: Angiosperms
- Clade: Monocots
- Order: Liliales
- Family: Liliaceae
- Subfamily: Lilioideae
- Tribe: Lilieae
- Genus: Lilium
- Species: L. washingtonianum

Binomial name
- Lilium washingtonianum Kellogg

= Lilium washingtonianum =

Species of lily

Lilium washingtonianum is a North American plant species in the lily family. It is also known as the Washington lily, Shasta lily, or Mt. Hood lily. It is named after Martha Washington and not the state of Washington; in fact, as the northern range of the plant is near Mount Hood in Oregon, it does not naturally occur in the state of Washington.

== Description ==
Lilium washingtonianum grows up to 100-200 cm tall, and bears one to thirty strongly large fragrant white or pinkish flowers that are often decorated with purplish spots that open before dusk. The flowers turn purple with age. The plant blooms from June to July. The tepals are 6 to 9 cm long and not strongly reflexed. Each flower has three carpels, six stamens, yellow anthers, green filaments, and seeds that ripen in elongated 2.7 to 5.8 cm seed capsules.

The rounded bulbs, covered in white scales, form rhizomes and are very sensitive when dug up. The stem has a waxy, bluish coating that easily rubs off, giving it a frosty appearance. The light green, lance-shaped leaves are 3/4 to 1 1/2 inches wide and 1 1/2 to 5 inches long, arranged in one to eight whorls of three to sixteen leaves. They have sharp points and distinct veins. The seeds germinate in a delayed hypogeal manner.

Subspecies

- Lilium washingtonianum subsp. purpurascens (Stearn) M.W.Skinner - flowers aging deep pink or lavender
- Lilium washingtonianum subsp. washingtonianum - flowers aging pink or white

== Distribution ==
Lilium washingtonianum is native to the Cascade Range and Sierra Nevada of western North America. Its range is limited to the states of California and Oregon. It is typically found in chaparral, open woods, recently burned areas, or revegetating clearcuts.
