= Nothocestrum peltatum =

Oʻahu ʻaiea

Conservation status
- Critically Endangered (IUCN 3.1)

Scientific classification
- Kingdom: Plantae
- Clade: Tracheophytes
- Clade: Angiosperms
- Clade: Eudicots
- Clade: Asterids
- Order: Solanales
- Family: Solanaceae
- Genus: Nothocestrum
- Species: N. peltatum

Binomial name
- Nothocestrum peltatum Skottsb.

Species of tree

Nothocestrum peltatum, the Oʻahu ʻaiea, is a species of flowering plant in the nightshade family, Solanaceae, that is endemic to the island of Kauaʻi in Hawaiʻi. It can be found in mesic forests at elevations of 915–1,220 metres (3,002–4,003 ft). There are only about 23 individuals remaining.

Oʻahu ʻaiea is threatened by habitat loss. It is also threatened by introduced species of plants in its habitat, such as banana poka (Passiflora tarminiana), passionfruit (Passiflora edulis), daisy fleabane (Erigeron karvinskianus) (daisy fleabane), lantana (Lantana camara), blackberry (Rubus argutus), karakanut (Corynocarpus laevigatus), and air plant (Bryophyllum pinnatum).
