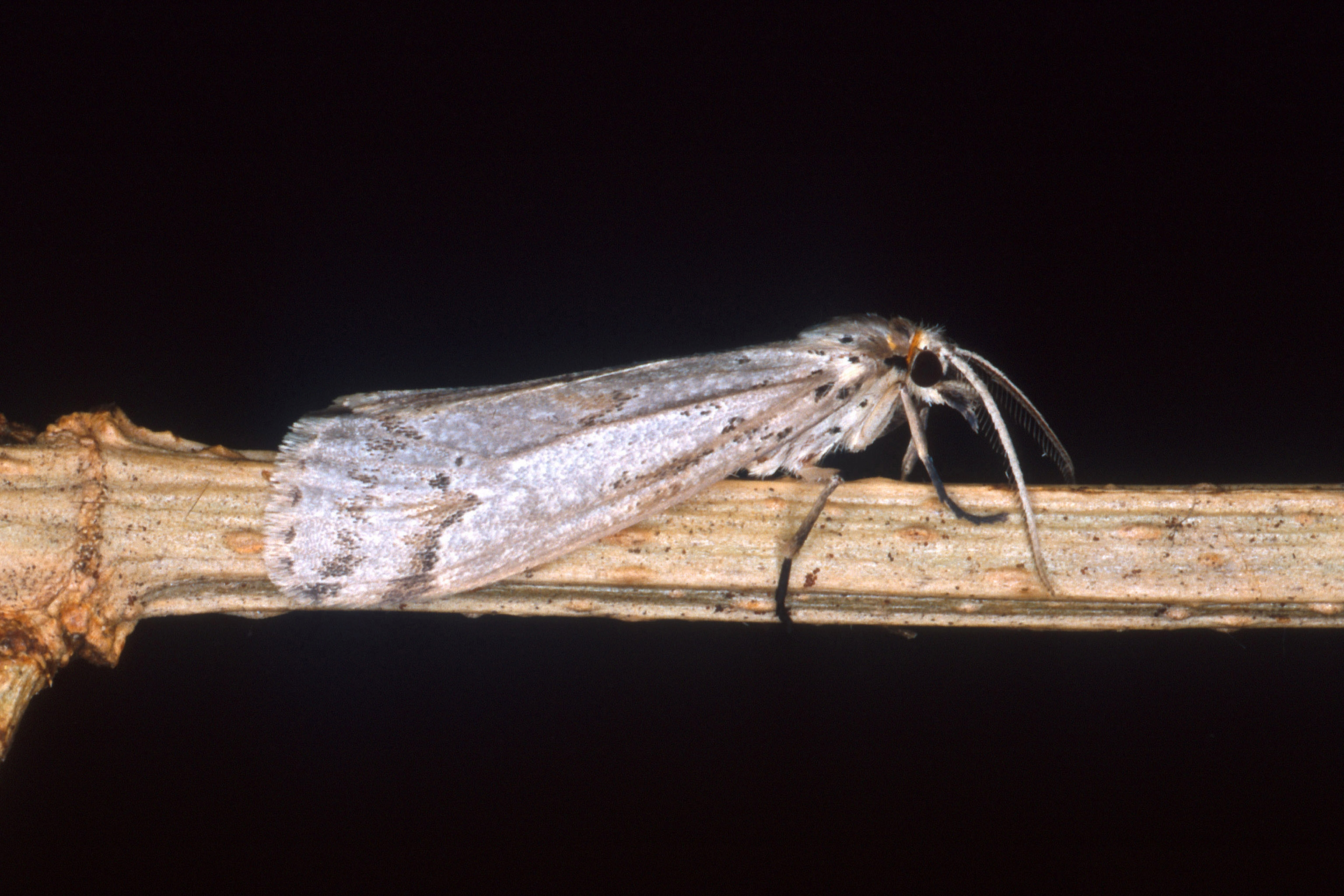
- Unidentified Acrolepia sp.

Scientific classification
- Kingdom: Animalia
- Phylum: Arthropoda
- Class: Insecta
- Order: Lepidoptera
- Family: Acrolepiidae
- Genus: Acrolepia; Curtis, 1838

Species
- See text

Synonyms
- Antispastis Meyrick, 1926

= Acrolepia =

Genus of moths

Acrolepia is a genus of moths in the family Acrolepiidae.

== Species ==
The following species are classified:

- Acrolepia afghanistanella
- Acrolepia aiea
- Acrolepia aleuritis
- Acrolepia asiatica
- Acrolepia aureella
- Acrolepia aureonigrella
- Acrolepia autumnitella
- Acrolepia beardsleyi
- Acrolepia bythodes
- Acrolepia canachopis
- Acrolepia cestrella
- Acrolepia chalarodesma
- Acrolepia chalcolampra
- Acrolepia chariphanes
- Acrolepia conchitis
- Acrolepia corticosa
- Acrolepia dioscoreivora
- Acrolepia elaphrodes
- Acrolepia gelida
- Acrolepia halosema
- Acrolepia jaspidata
- Acrolepia kasyi
- Acrolepia maculella
- Acrolepia manganeutis
- Acrolepia marmaropis
- Acrolepia mixotypa
- Acrolepia moriuti
- Acrolepia niphosperma
- Acrolepia nitrodes
- Acrolepia nodulata
- Acrolepia nothocestri
- Acrolepia oxyglypta
- Acrolepia peyerhimoffella
- Acrolepia poliopis
- Acrolepia prasinaula
- Acrolepia rejecta
- Acrolepia rungsella
- Acrolepia seraphica
- Acrolepia syrphacopis
- Acrolepia tharsalea
- Acrolepia xiphias
