= Nothocestrum longifolium =

Longleaf ʻaiea

Conservation status
- Near Threatened (IUCN 2.3)

Scientific classification
- Kingdom: Plantae
- Clade: Tracheophytes
- Clade: Angiosperms
- Clade: Eudicots
- Clade: Asterids
- Order: Solanales
- Family: Solanaceae
- Genus: Nothocestrum
- Species: N. longifolium

Binomial name
- Nothocestrum longifolium A.Gray

Species of tree

Nothocestrum longifolium, the longleaf ʻaiea, is a species of tree in the nightshade family, Solanaceae, that is endemic to Hawaiʻi. It can be found in mesic and wet forests at elevations of 360–1,620 metres (1,180–5,310 ft) on the islands of Maui, Molokaʻi, Lānaʻi, Oʻahu, Kauaʻi. It is threatened by habitat loss.

An analysis of the berries revealed them to be one of the most protein-rich of the fruits consumed by nestlings of Corvus hawaiiensis, the Hawaiian crow.
