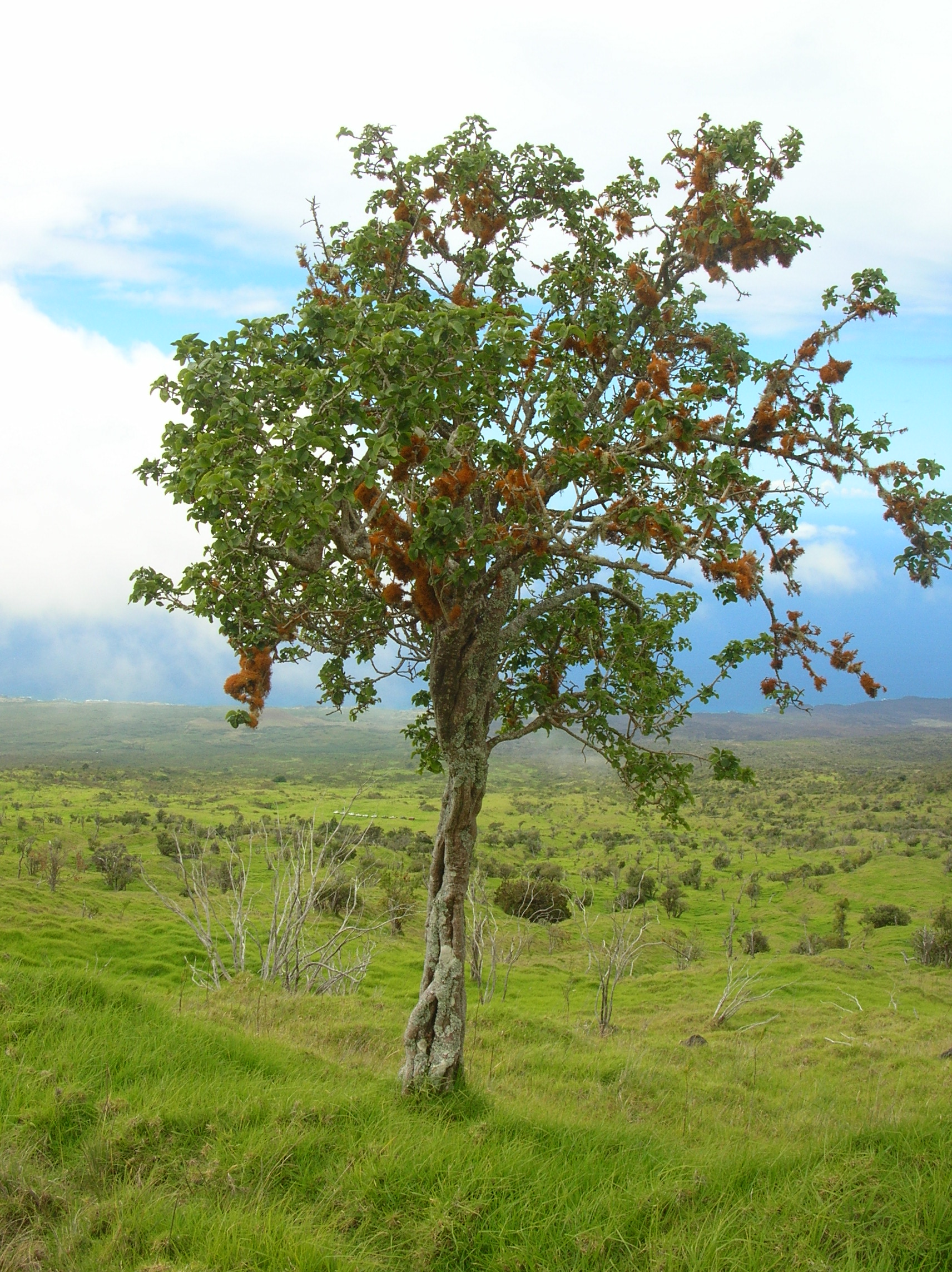

Conservation status
- Endangered (IUCN 2.3)

Scientific classification
- Kingdom: Plantae
- Clade: Tracheophytes
- Clade: Angiosperms
- Clade: Eudicots
- Clade: Asterids
- Order: Solanales
- Family: Solanaceae
- Genus: Nothocestrum
- Species: N. latifolium

Binomial name
- Nothocestrum latifolium A.Gray

Synonyms
- Nothocestrum subcordatum H.Mann

= Nothocestrum latifolium =

Species of tree

Nothocestrum latifolium, commonly known as broadleaf ʻaiea, is a species of flowering plant in the nightshade family, Solanaceae, that is endemic to Hawaiʻi. It can be found in dry and mesic forests at elevations of 460–1,530 m (1,510–5,020 ft) on the islands of Maui, Molokaʻi, Lānaʻi, Oʻahu, and Kauaʻi. Broadleaf ʻaiea is threatened by habitat loss. The CDP of ʻAiea on Oʻahu was named after this species.

== Uses ==
Native Hawaiians used the soft, greenish wood of ʻaiea to make pale (gunwales) for waʻa (outrigger canoes) and ʻaho (thatching sticks).The reddish yellow berries were sometimes eaten, while the bark and leaves were used for (unspecified) medicinal purposes.
