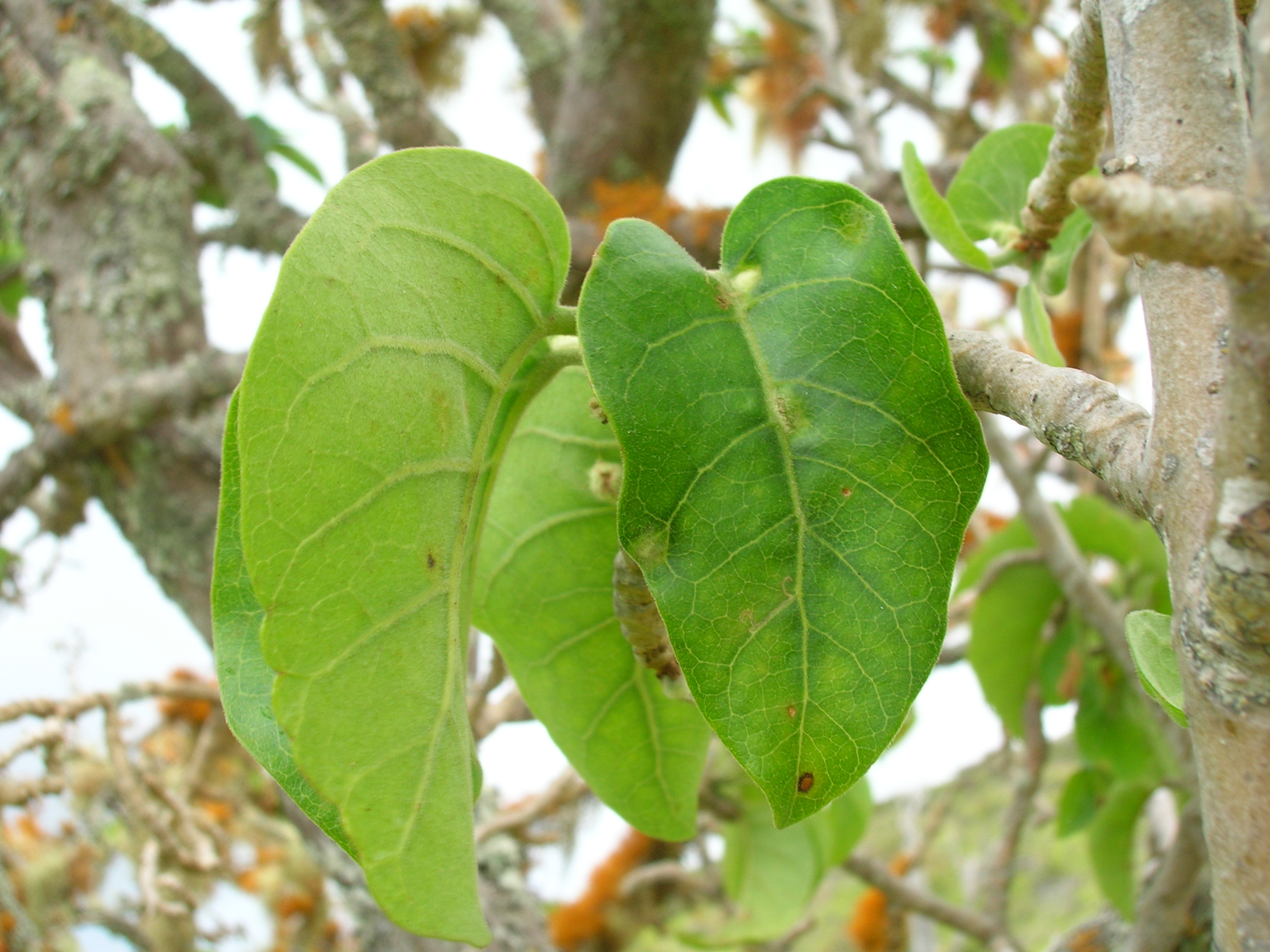
- Broadleaf ʻaiea (Nothocestrum latifolium)

Scientific classification
- Kingdom: Plantae
- Clade: Tracheophytes
- Clade: Angiosperms
- Clade: Eudicots
- Clade: Asterids
- Order: Solanales
- Family: Solanaceae
- Subfamily: Solanoideae
- Tribe: Physaleae
- Genus: Nothocestrum; A.Gray

Species
- See text

= Nothocestrum =

Genus of trees

Nothocestrum is a genus of flowering plants in the nightshade family, Solanaceae. It contains four species of large shrubs or small trees that are endemic to Hawaii, where they are known as ʻaiea.

== Species ==
- Nothocestrum breviflorum A.Gray – Smallflower ʻaiea (island of Hawaiʻi)
- Nothocestrum latifolium A.Gray – Broadleaf ʻaiea (Maui, Molokaʻi, Lānaʻi, Oʻahu, Kauaʻi)
- Nothocestrum longifolium A.Gray – Longleaf ʻaiea (island of Hawaiʻi, Maui, Molokaʻi, Lānaʻi, Oʻahu, Kauaʻi)
- Nothocestrum peltatum Skottsb. – Oʻahu ʻaiea (Kauaʻi)

== Medicinal use ==
The leaves, bark, and tap root of Nothocestrum spp. were used to make infusions applied topically to treat abscesses, the plant parts being pounded, mixed with water, strained, heated with hot rocks, and cooled before application. The same plant parts were also made into a liquid medicine taken internally to treat abscesses. This medicine also contained ‘ohi‘a bark (Metrosideros spp.), moa holo kula (Psilotum nudum) and kō honua‘ula (red/purple sugarcane, Saccharum officinarum).
