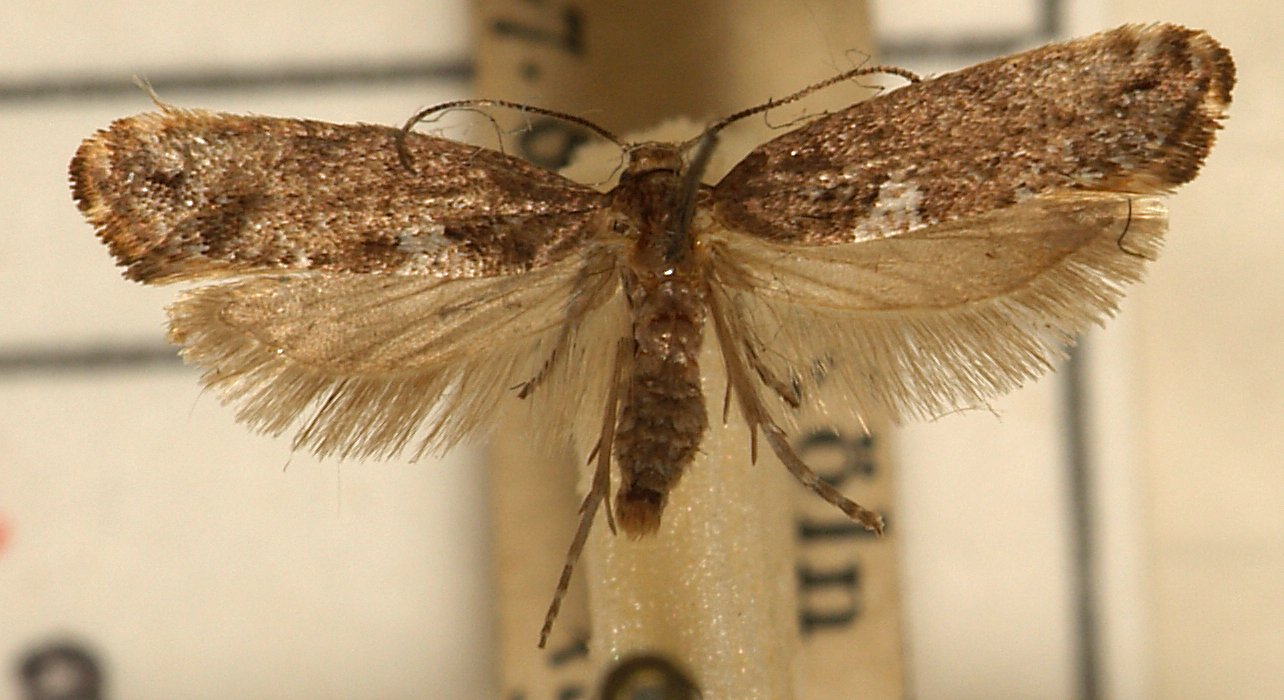
- Acrolepiopsis assectella

Scientific classification
- Domain: Eukaryota
- Kingdom: Animalia
- Phylum: Arthropoda
- Class: Insecta
- Order: Lepidoptera
- Superfamily: Yponomeutoidea
- Family: Acrolepiidae; Heinemann, 1870

Genera
- Acrolepia Curtis, 1838; Acrolepiopsis Gaedike, 1970; Digitivalva Gaedike, 1970; Digitivalvopsis Budashkin, 1995

= Acrolepiidae =

Family of moths

The Acrolepiidae are a family of moths known as false diamondback moths. In modern classifications, they are often treated as a subfamily (Acrolepiinae) of the family Glyphipterigidae.

Caterpillars are typically spotted and 10 to 12 mm in length. Adults have a wingspan between 16 and 18 mm and are generally nocturnal.

== Species ==
Some representative species are:

- Acrolepia aiea, Swezey 1933
- Acrolepia alliella, Sato 1979
- Acrolepia autumnitella, Curtis 1838
- Acrolepia nothocestri, Busck 1914
- Acrolepiopsis assectella, Zeller, 1839
- Acrolepiopsis betulella, Curtis 1838
- Acrolepiopsis incertella, Chambers 1872
- Acrolepiopsis marcidella, Curtis 1850
- Acrolepiopsis sapporensis, Matsumura 1931
- Acrolepiopsis tauricella, Staudinger 1870
- Acrolepiopsis vesperella, Zeller 1850
- Digitivalva arnicella, Heyden 1863
- Digitivalva eglanteriella, Mann 1855
- Digitivalva granitella, Treitschke 1833
- Digitivalva occidentella, Klimesch 1956
- Digitivalva pulicariae, Klimesch 1956
- Digitivalva reticulella, Hübner 1796
