= New Zealand raspberry budmoth =

New Zealand raspberry budmoth may refer to:

- Carposina rubophaga
- A misnaming of Carposina adreptella
