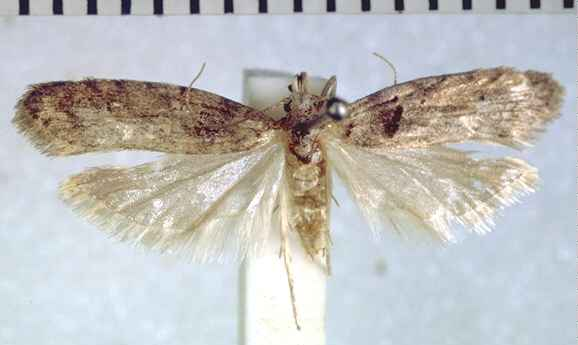
- Male holotype

Scientific classification
- Kingdom: Animalia
- Phylum: Arthropoda
- Class: Insecta
- Order: Lepidoptera
- Family: Carposinidae
- Genus: Heterocrossa
- Species: H. ignobilis

Binomial name
- Heterocrossa ignobilis (Philpott, 1930)

Synonyms
- Carposina ignobilis Philpott, 1930

= Heterocrossa ignobilis =

Species of moth

Heterocrossa ignobilis is a species of moth in the family Carposinidae. It was described by Alfred Philpott and is endemic to New Zealand and has been observed in Canterbury, in the South Island. Adults are on the wing in January.

== Taxonomy ==
This species was first described by Alfred Philpott in 1930 using material he collected at Governors Bush, Mount Cook and named Carposina ignobilis. George Hudson discussed this species under that name in 1939 in A supplement to the butterflies and moths of New Zealand. In 1978 Elwood Zimmerman argued that the genus Heterocrassa should not be a synonym of Carposina as the genitalia of the species within the genus Heterocrassa are distinctive. He proposed that endemic New Zealand species that agreed with the original type specimen of the genus Heterocrassa be assigned to that genus. In 1988 Dugdale assigned this species to the genus Heterocrossa. The male holotype specimen is held at the Canterbury Museum. Hudson pointed out that the holotype specimen is in poor condition.

== Description ==
Philpott described this species as follows:

♂. 16 mm. Head, palpi and thorax grey mixed with brown. Antennae ochreous-grey spotted with fuscous, ciliations in ♂ 3. Abdomen ochreous. Legs ochreous, anterior pair infuscated. Forewings narrow, hardly dilated posteriorly, costa rather strongly arched, apex round-pointed, termen very oblique; ochreous-grey densely irrorated with fuscous; basal patch indicated by blackish scales, more prominently below fold; an oblique blackish scale-tuft crossing fold at about ¼, suffusedly margined inwardly with a fuscous shade which extends right across wing; some very obscure dark spots on apical ⅔ of costa; an obscure blackish spot in disc at ¾: fringes densely speckled with fuscous and whitish. Hindwings shining grey: fringes whitish-ochreous.

Philpott stated this species was likely related to H. canescens but that it could be distinguished as the male of H. ignobilis had quite different genital characteristics and also lacked the ochreous patch on costa of hindwing which can be found in H. canescens adult moths.

== Distribution ==
This species is endemic to New Zealand. It has been collected in Canterbury.

== Biology and behaviour ==
This species is on the wing in January.
