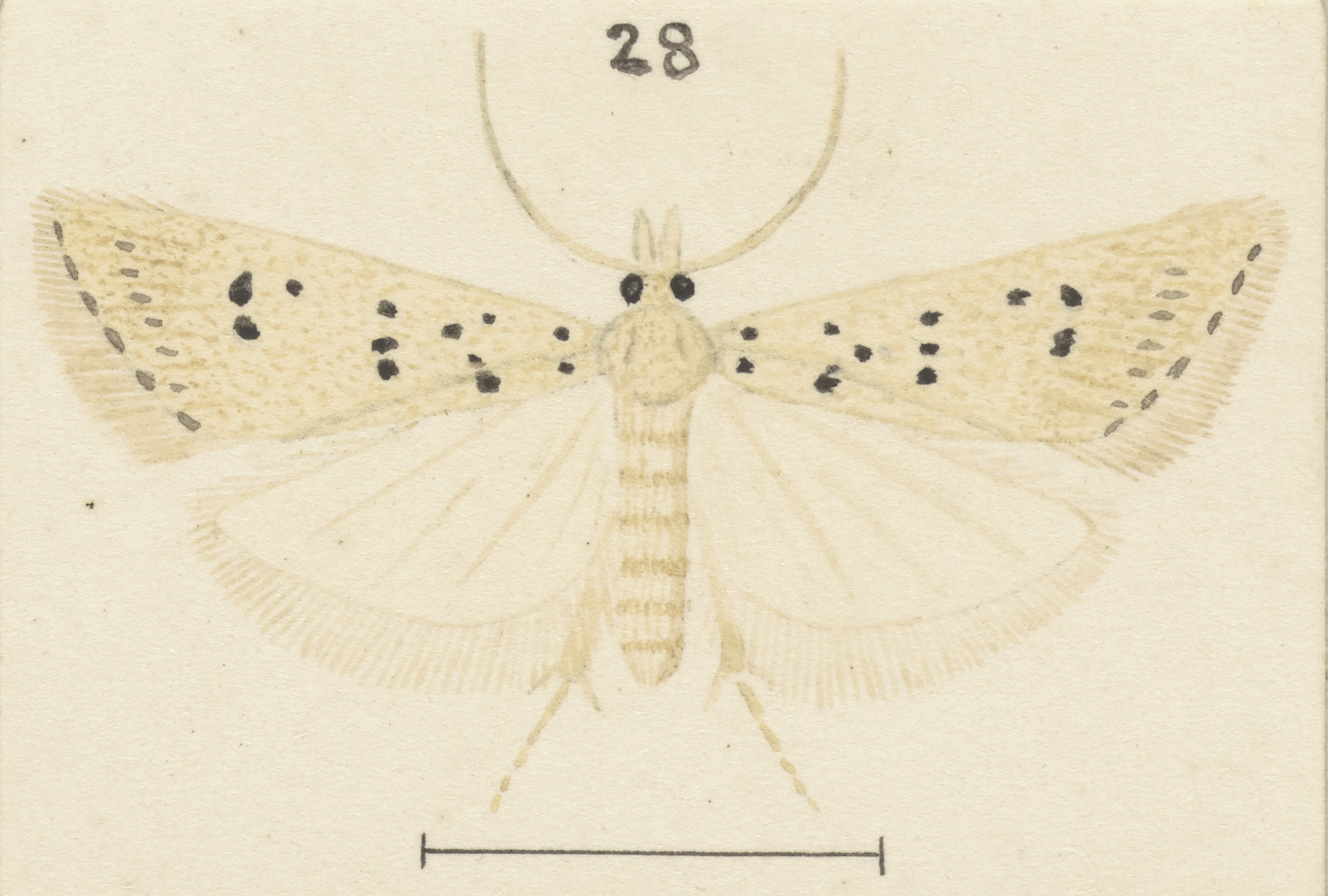
- Illustration of male

Scientific classification
- Kingdom: Animalia
- Phylum: Arthropoda
- Class: Insecta
- Order: Lepidoptera
- Family: Carposinidae
- Genus: Heterocrossa
- Species: H. maculosa

Binomial name
- Heterocrossa maculosa (Philpott, 1927)

Synonyms
- Carposina maculosa Philpott, 1927

= Heterocrossa maculosa =

Species of moth

Heterocrossa maculosa is a species of moth in the family Carposinidae. It is endemic to New Zealand and has been found in the southern half of the South Island. Larvae feed on Hoheria angustifolia and Plagianthus regius. Adults are on the wing from November to January. This species is classified as "Data Deficient" by the Department of Conservation.

== Taxonomy ==
This species was originally described by Alfred Philpott in 1927 using a specimen collected from Coopers Knob, Banks Peninsula by Stewart Lindsay and named Carposina maculosa. George Hudson discussed this species under this name in his 1928 publication The Butterflies and Moths of New Zealand. Later that same year Alfred Philpott examined the genitalia of male species of what was then known as C. maculosa. In 1978 Elwood Zimmerman argued that the genus Heterocrassa should not be a synonym of Carposina as the genitalia in this genus are distinctive. Subsequently John S. Dugdale placed this species within the genus Heterocrossa. The holotype specimen is held at the New Zealand Arthropod Collection.

== Description ==
Philpott originally described the species as follows:

♂ ♀ 18 mm. Head, antennae and thorax light buff. Palpi light buff mixed with ochreous on lower half externally. Abdomen ochreous-white. Legs ochreous-white, anterior and middle parts infuscated. Forewings moderate, costa moderately arched at base, thence straight, apex subacute, termen straight, oblique; light buff finely irrorated with pale fuscous; markings fuscous-black; a dot beneath costa near base and a similar one obliquely before it above dorsum; a minute dot beneath costa at 1/4 and a much larger one beneath it below fold; a dot in disc beyond these; a dot beneath costa and two below it in disc before 1/2; a small dot beneath costa between these and 3/4; two or three dots touching each other and forming a short transverse striga at 3/4; an obscure irregular striga from costa at 4/5 to tornus; a series round termen: fringes whitish-buff. Hindwings and fringes shining white.

Philpott was of the opinion that the distinctive dots as well as the ground colour on the forewings of adults of this species distinguishes it from others in the genus. However Hudson was of the opinion that it was similar in appearance to H. literata.

== Distribution ==
This species is endemic to New Zealand. As well as the type locality, it has been observed in the Lyttelton Hills, Hoon Hay Bush, and in the Aoraki / Mt Cook National Park in Canterbury as well as in Otago.

== Biology and behaviour ==
The adult moths are on the wing from November to January.

== Host species and habitat ==
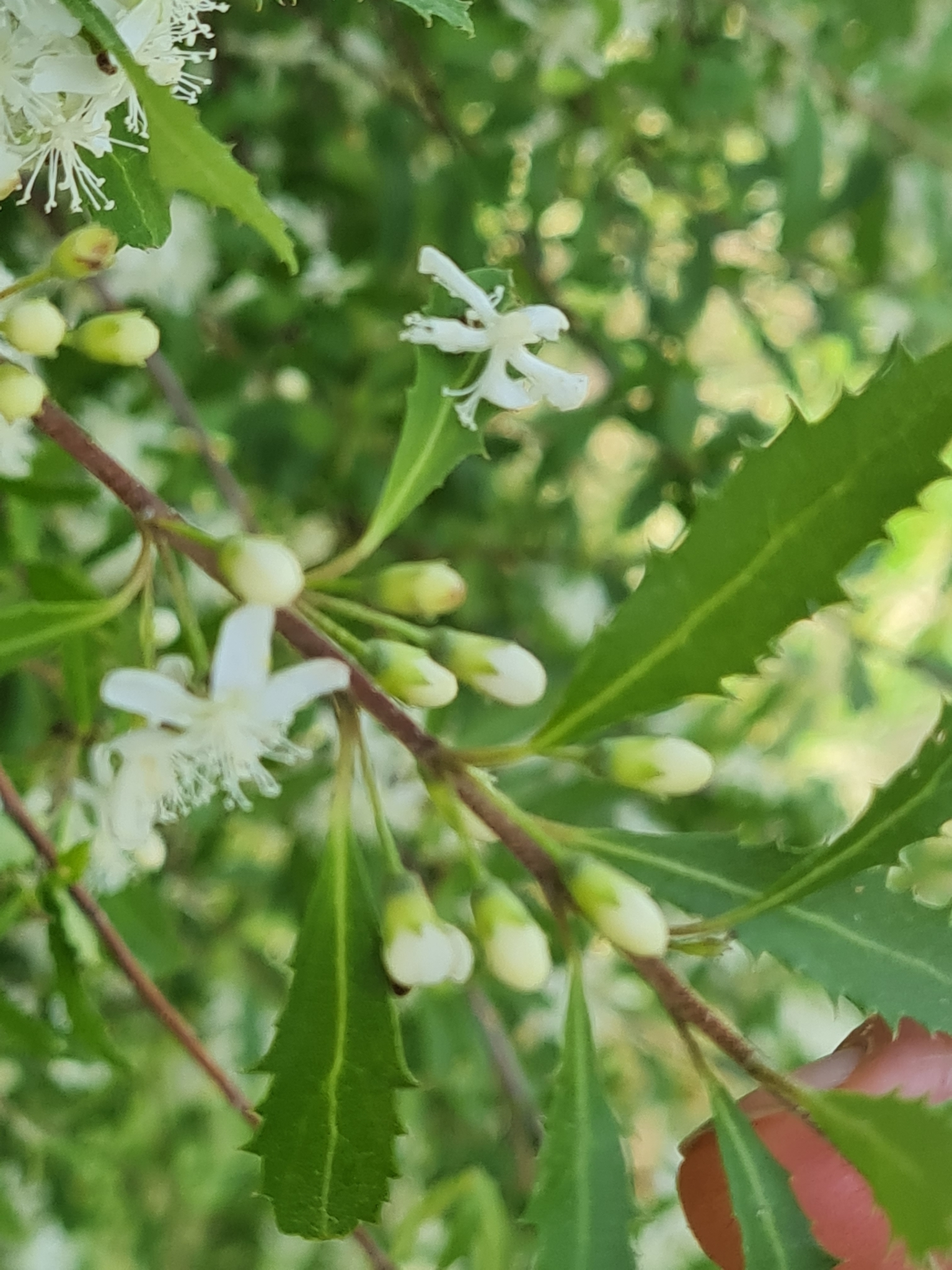
Larval host Hoheria angustifolia.

The larvae feed on Hoheria angustifolia and Plagianthus regius.

== Conservation status ==
This species has been classified as having the "Data Deficient" conservation status under the New Zealand Threat Classification System. The main risks to this species are likely habitat fragmentation and loss.
