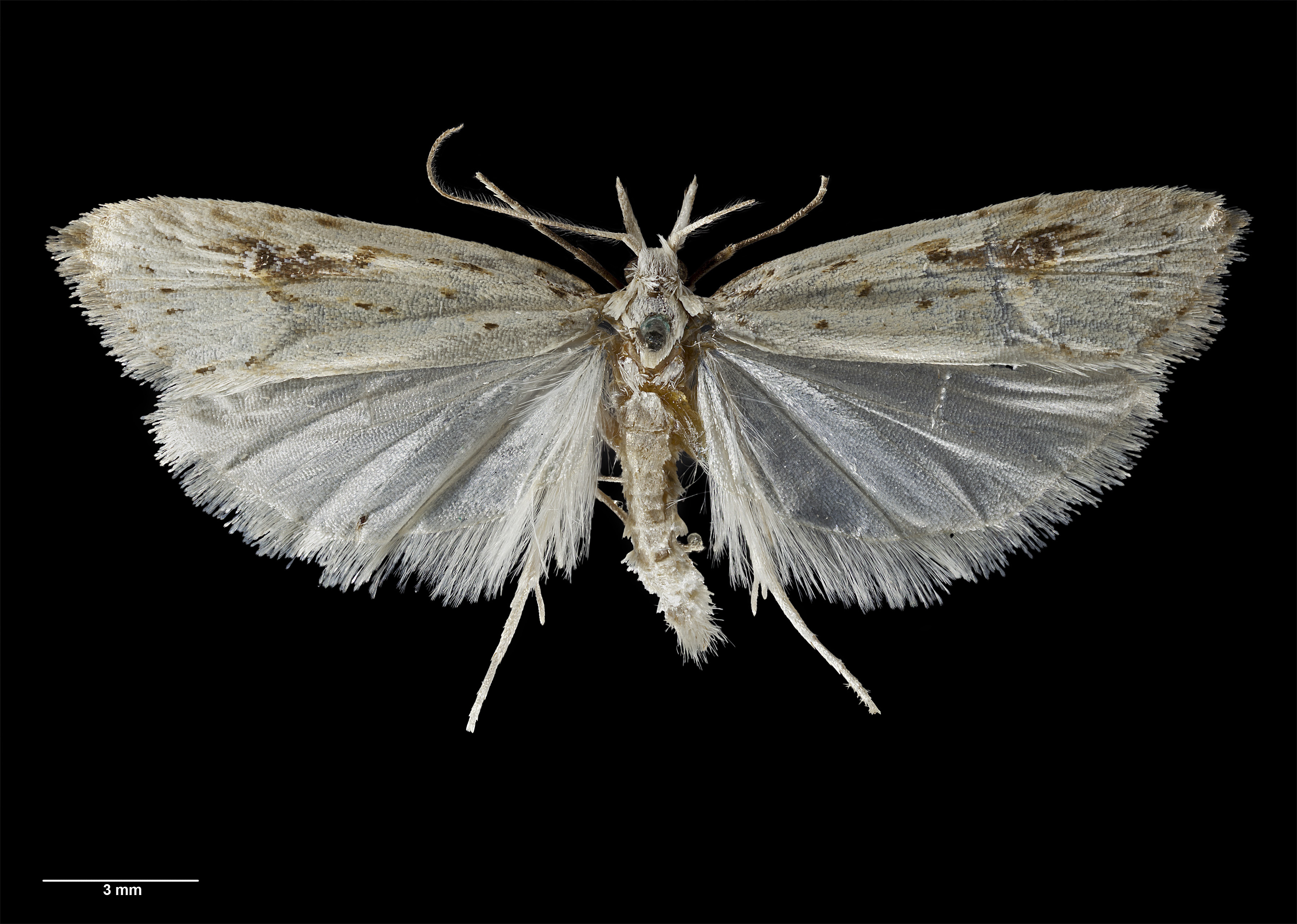
- Male holotype

Scientific classification
- Kingdom: Animalia
- Phylum: Arthropoda
- Class: Insecta
- Order: Lepidoptera
- Family: Carposinidae
- Genus: Heterocrossa
- Species: H. literata

Binomial name
- Heterocrossa literata (Philpott, 1930)

Synonyms
- Carposina literata Philpott, 1930

= Heterocrossa literata =

Species of moth

Heterocrossa literata is a moth of the Carposinidae family first described by Alfred Philpott in 1930. It is endemic to New Zealand and has been observed the Franz Josef Glacier in subalpine habitat on the West Coast. Adults are on the wing in January.

== Taxonomy ==
This species was first described by Alfred Philpott in 1930 using specimens collected by Charles Edwin Clarke at Defiance Hut (now at the Franz Josef Visitor Centre) at Cape Defiance, above the Franz Josef Glacier and named Carposina literata. In 1939 George Hudson discussed and illustrated this species in his book A supplement to the butterflies and moths of New Zealand. In 1978 Elwood Zimmerman argued that the genus Heterocrassa should not be a synonym of Carposina as the genitalia of the species within the genus Heterocrassa are distinctive. In 1988 John S. Dugdale assigned the species to the genus Heterocrossa. The male holotype specimen is held at the Auckland War Memorial Museum.

== Description ==
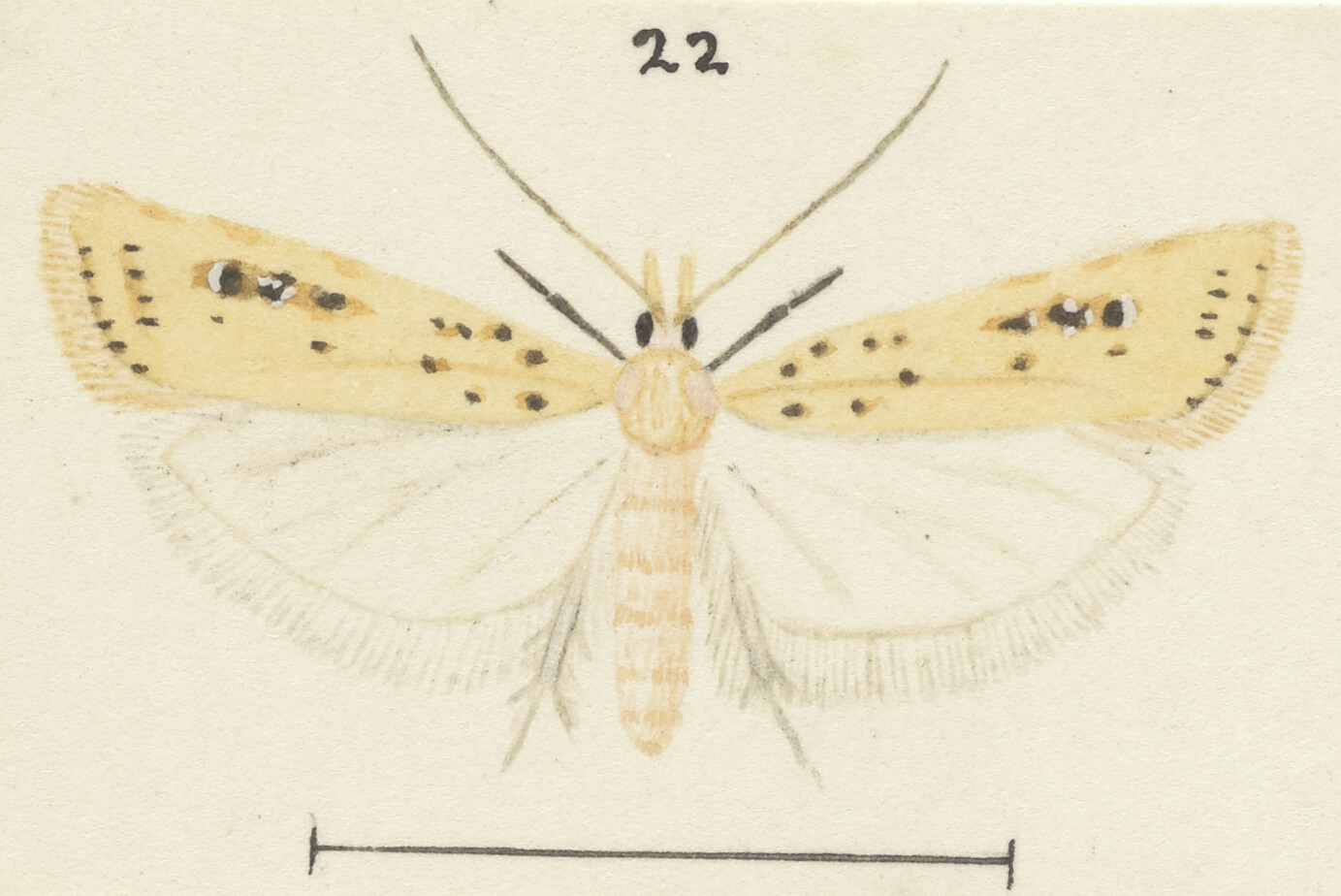
Illustration by G. Hudson

Philpott described this species as follows:

♂♀ . 22-24 mm. Head and thorax ochreous whitish. Palpi ochreous whitish, mixed with brown except towards base, ciliations in ♂ 5. Abdomen white. Legs whitish ochreous, anterior pair fuscous. Forewings with costa strongly arched, apex rather sharp, termen almost straight, oblique; creamy white; markings blackish fuscous margined with rather bright ochreous and sometimes mixed with white; an inwardly oblique series of spots (3) close to base; a dot below costa before 1/4 and one beneath it well below fold; a third in disc beyond forms a conspicuous triangle. A rather large spot below costa almost at 1/2, from which proceeds a suffused streak halfway to apex including other dots and a large white-ringed spot near to its apex; a few brownish dots on costa above this streak; a subterminal series of spots most prominent in disc; a series of dots round termen: fringes ochreous whitish mixed with brownish. Hindwings shining white: fringes white.

Hudson pointed out that this species is very similar in appearance to H. exochana as both species have a dark discal streak on their forewings. However the two species can be distinguished as Hudson states that with H. exochana "the termen is slightly sinuate below apex and, in most specimens, a shading of brownish ochreous is visible between the veins".

== Distribution and habitat ==
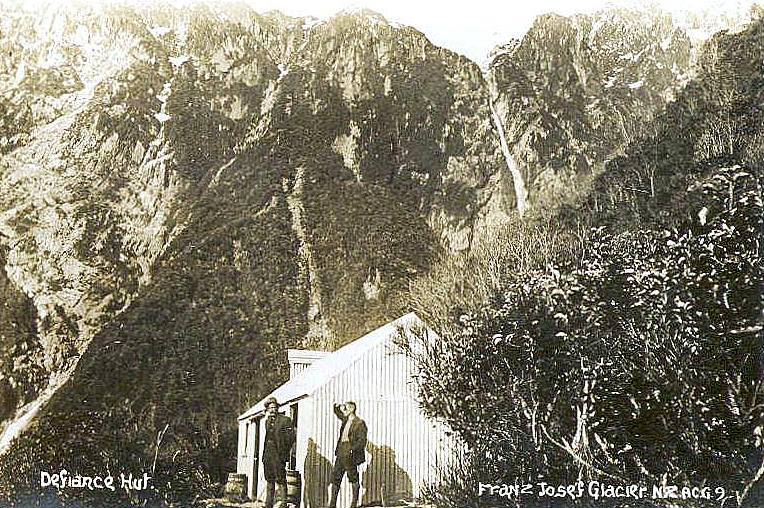
Defiance Hut and the sounding habitat preferred by H. literata.

H. literata is endemic to New Zealand. It has been observed in subalpine habitat on the West Coast.

== Behaviour ==
Adults are on the wing in January.
