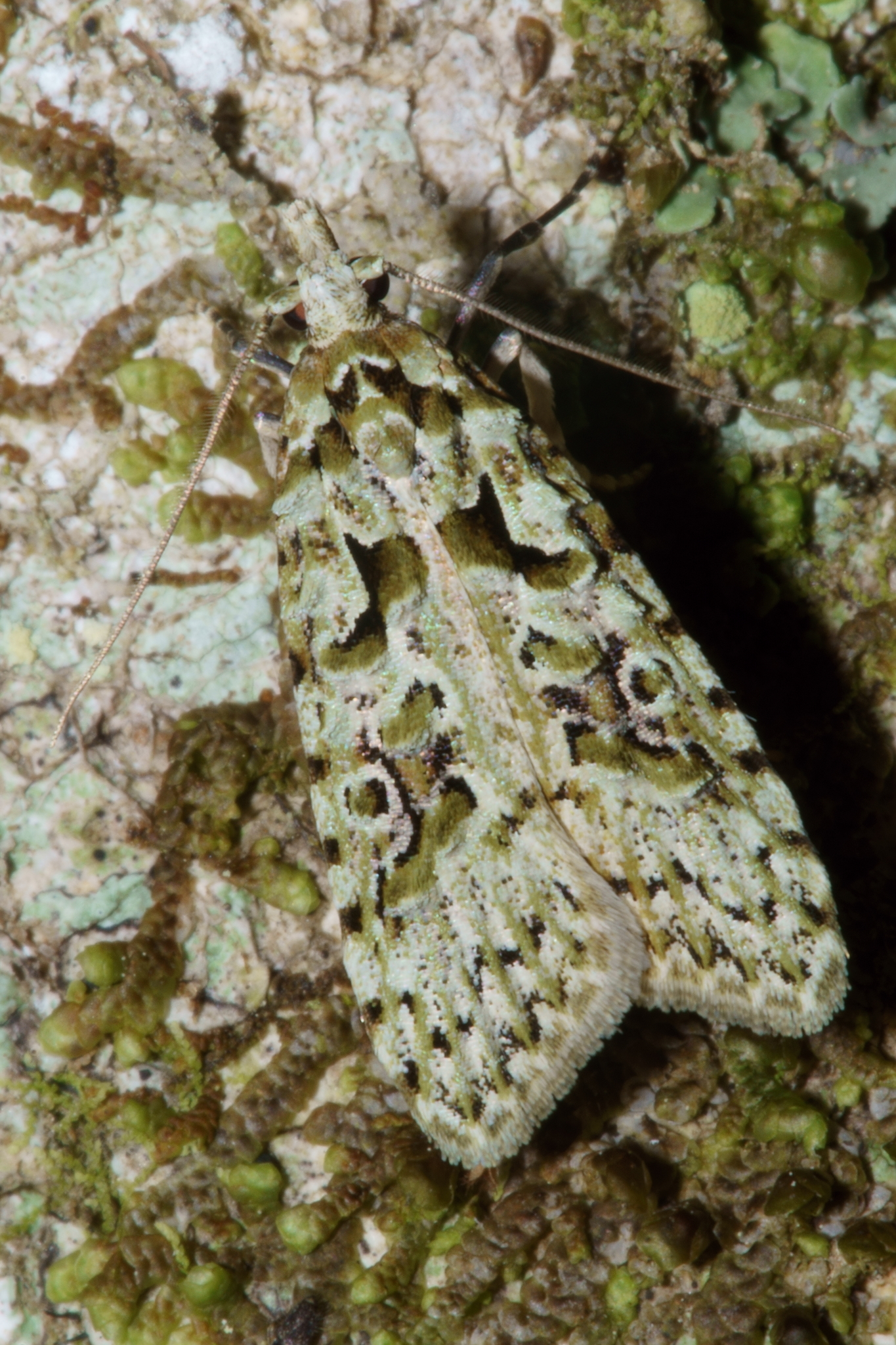

Scientific classification
- Kingdom: Animalia
- Phylum: Arthropoda
- Clade: Pancrustacea
- Class: Insecta
- Order: Lepidoptera
- Family: Carposinidae
- Genus: Heterocrossa
- Species: H. eriphylla

Binomial name
- Heterocrossa eriphylla Meyrick, 1888

Synonyms
- Carposina eriphylla (Meyrick, 1888)

= Heterocrossa eriphylla =

Species of moth

Heterocrossa eriphylla is a species of moth in the family Carposinidae. It is endemic to New Zealand and is found in the North Island and the northern parts of the South Island. This species is regarded as relatively uncommon and inhabits native forest. The larvae feed on the healing wounds of New Zealand beech trees Fuscospora fusca and Fuscospora truncata. It pupates at its feeding site and emerges from December onward. The adult moth is nocturnal and is attracted to light. During the day the moth rests on lichen covered tree trunks where their lichen mimicking colouration assists with their camouflage.

== Taxonomy ==
This species was described by Edward Meyrick in 1888 using a specimen he collected in Wellington in January. In 1922 Meyrick classified Heterocrossa as a synonym of the genus Carposina. George Hudson followed Meyrick and discussed and illustrated this species under the name Carponsina eriphylla in his 1928 publication The Butterflies and Moths of New Zealand. In 1978 Elwood Zimmerman argued that the genus Heterocrassa should not be a synonym of Carposina as the genitalia of the species within the genus Heterocrassa are distinctive. In 1988 John S. Dugdale agreed with Zimmerman and assigned this species to the genus Heterocrossa. The holotype specimen is held at the Natural History Museum, London.

== Description ==
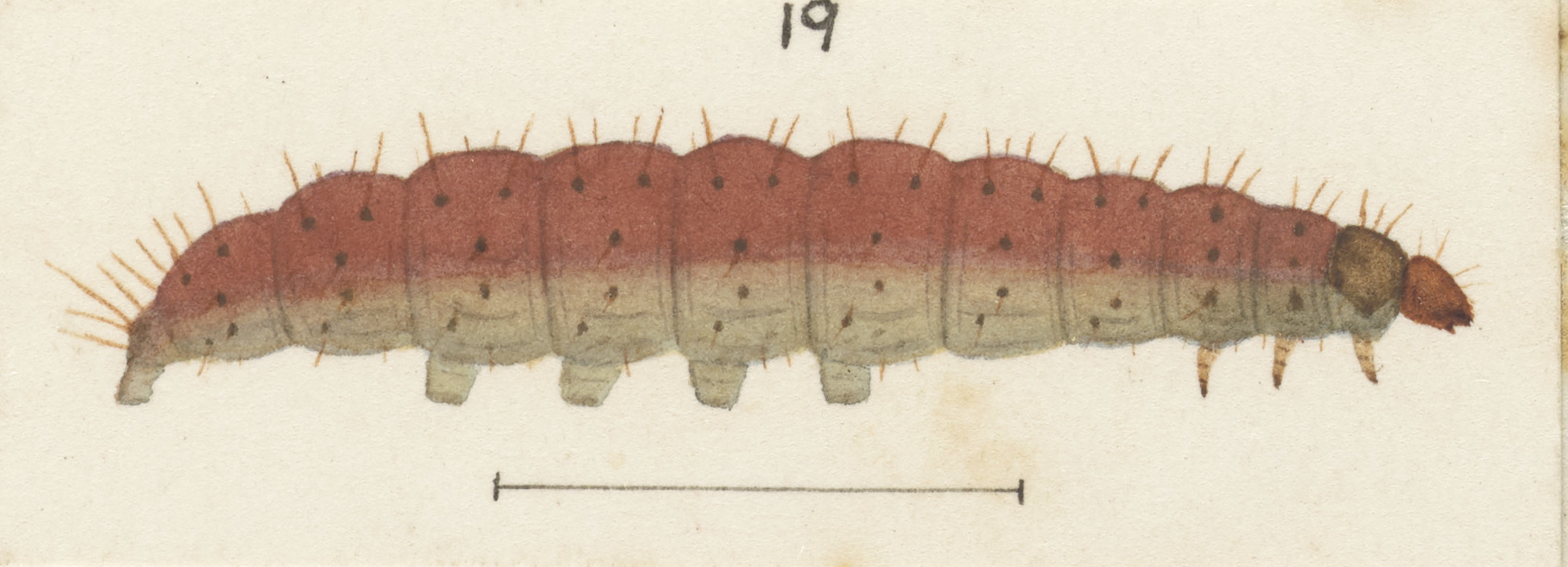
Illustration of H. eriphylla larva by George Hudson.

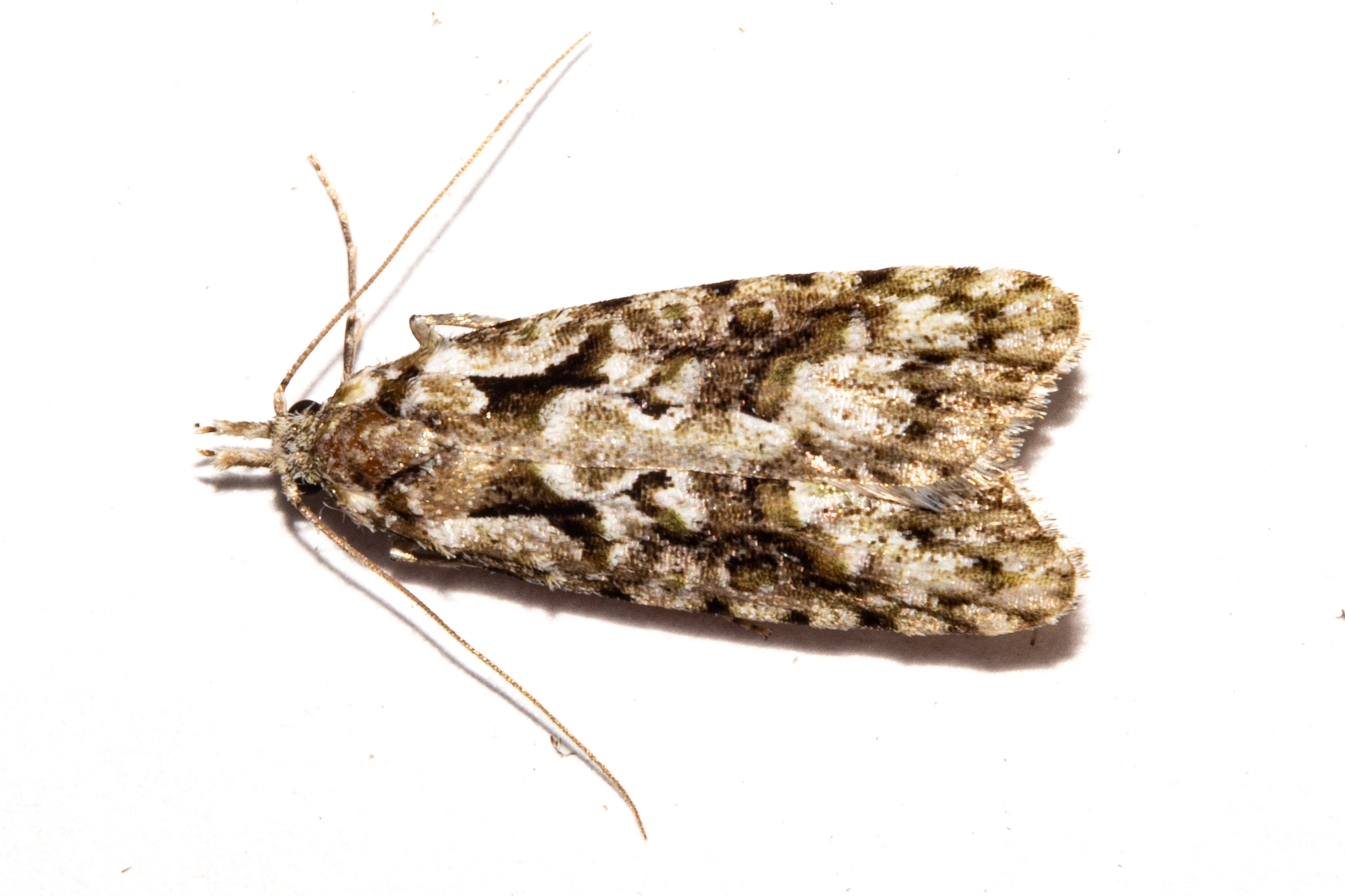
Yellowish brown specimen of H. eriphylla.

Hudson described the larva of the species as follows:

Its length when full-grown is about 3/4 inch. Cylindrical, slightly tapering at each end with the segments deeply excised. The head is dark reddish-brown, the second segment with shining brown dorsal plate; back of rest of segments bright pink, slightly tinged with purple; ventral surface pale whitish, slightly tinged with blue; there is a row of rather large horny warts around segments 2, 3 and 4; a double series of sub-dorsal warts on the other segments, except the last, and three lateral lines of such warts. The legs and prolegs are well developed.

The male adult of this species was described by Meyrick as follows:

Male. — 26 mm. Head and thorax whitish-greenish, shoulders olive-greenish. Palpi whitish-greenish, apex of basal joint and a band before middle of second fuscous. Antennae greyish-ochreous, basal joint dilated, whitish-greenish. Abdomen pale whitish-ochreous. Legs dark fuscous, apex of joints whitish, posterior pair pale whitish-ochreous. Forewings elongate, posteriorly slightly dilated, costa gently arched, apex obtuse, hindmargin straight, oblique; pale greenish, irregularly irrorated with white, especially towards hindmargin; about eight small black spots on costa, from which proceed obscure olive-green inwardly oblique strigulae; three inwardly oblique pairs of large tufts in disc, olive-green anteriorly, white posteriorly, margined above and below by small black spots, first near base, second at 1/3, third at 2/3; a short black streak on fold between second pair, crossed by a cloudy black mark margining them anteriorly; a slender white sinuate longitudinal line in disc between second and third pairs, unevenly black-margined, crossed by three or four irregular fine white strigae; a sub-terminal series of small fine irregular black marks, angulated in middle; hindmargin irregularly dotted with black scales : cilia whitish, towards base sprinkled with greenish. Hindwings and cilia whitish.

H. eriphylla varies in the intensity of the green colouration on its forewings with some specimens being a yellowish-brown shade.

== Distribution ==
This species is endemic to New Zealand. This species is found in the North Island and northern parts of the South Island. Specimens of this moth have been collected near the Wellington Botanic Gardens and at the Ōrongorongo Valley, as well as near Woodville in hill country. This moth has also been collected at Paroa. H. eriphylla is regarded as being relatively uncommon.

== Habitat and host species ==
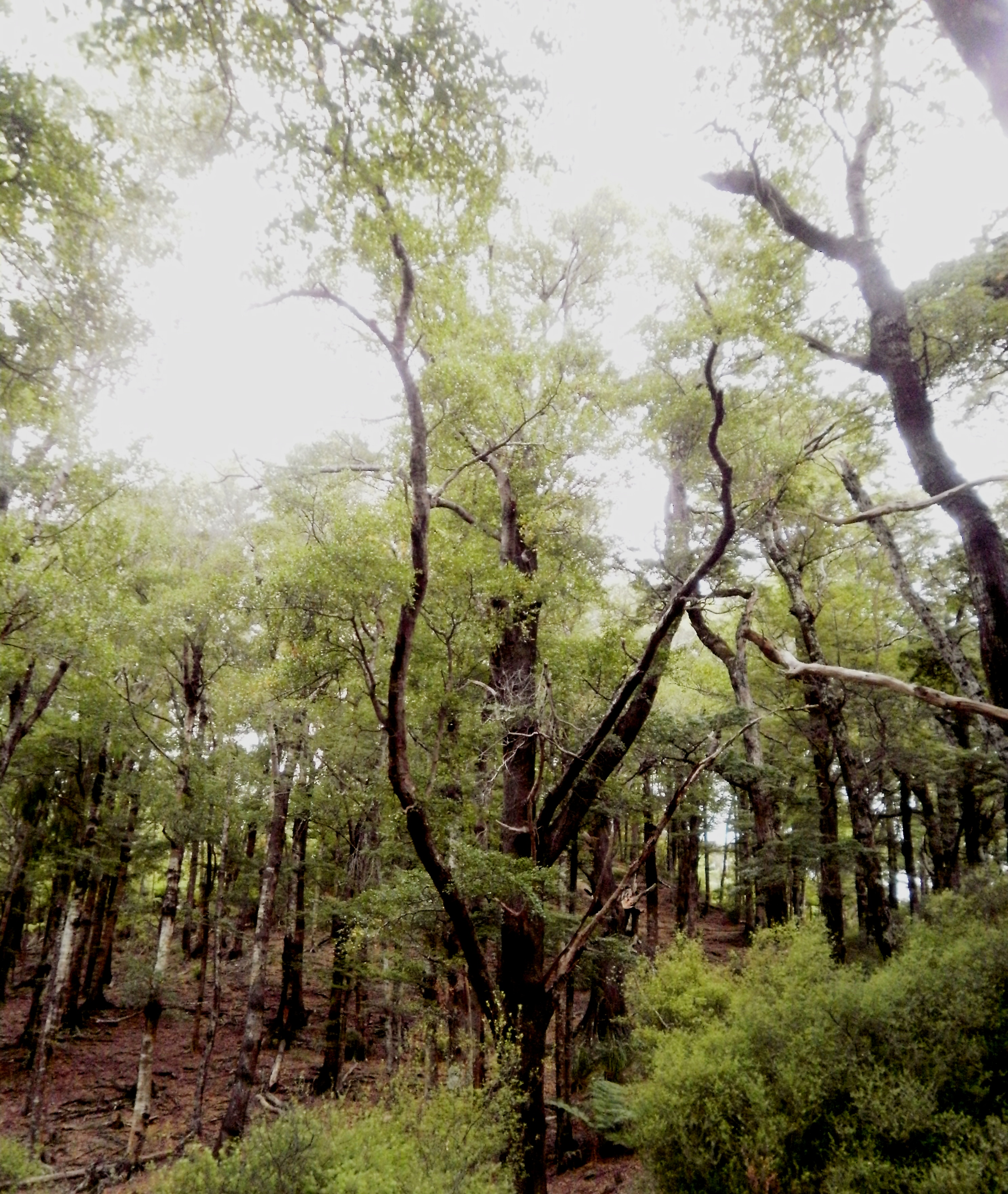
Host species Fuscospora truncata

H. eriphylla prefers native forest habitat. The larvae of this species feed on the wood of trees such as species of beach Fuscospora fusca and Fuscospora truncata as well as Vitex lucens.

== Biology and behaviour ==
The larvae of this species feed on the callus tissue generated by their host trees as a result of damage caused by other insects including Aenetus virescens. Larvae are fully developed by October. The species pupates at their feeding site and have been observed emerging in December. The adult moths have been observed on the wing all year round but are most frequently seen from September to April. This moth is a night flier and is attracted to light. During the day the adult moths rest on tree trunks where their variable lichen mimicking colouration assists with their camouflage. W. P. Cohen stated that he collected his specimens during the day while they were at rest on the trunks of weeping-willows.
