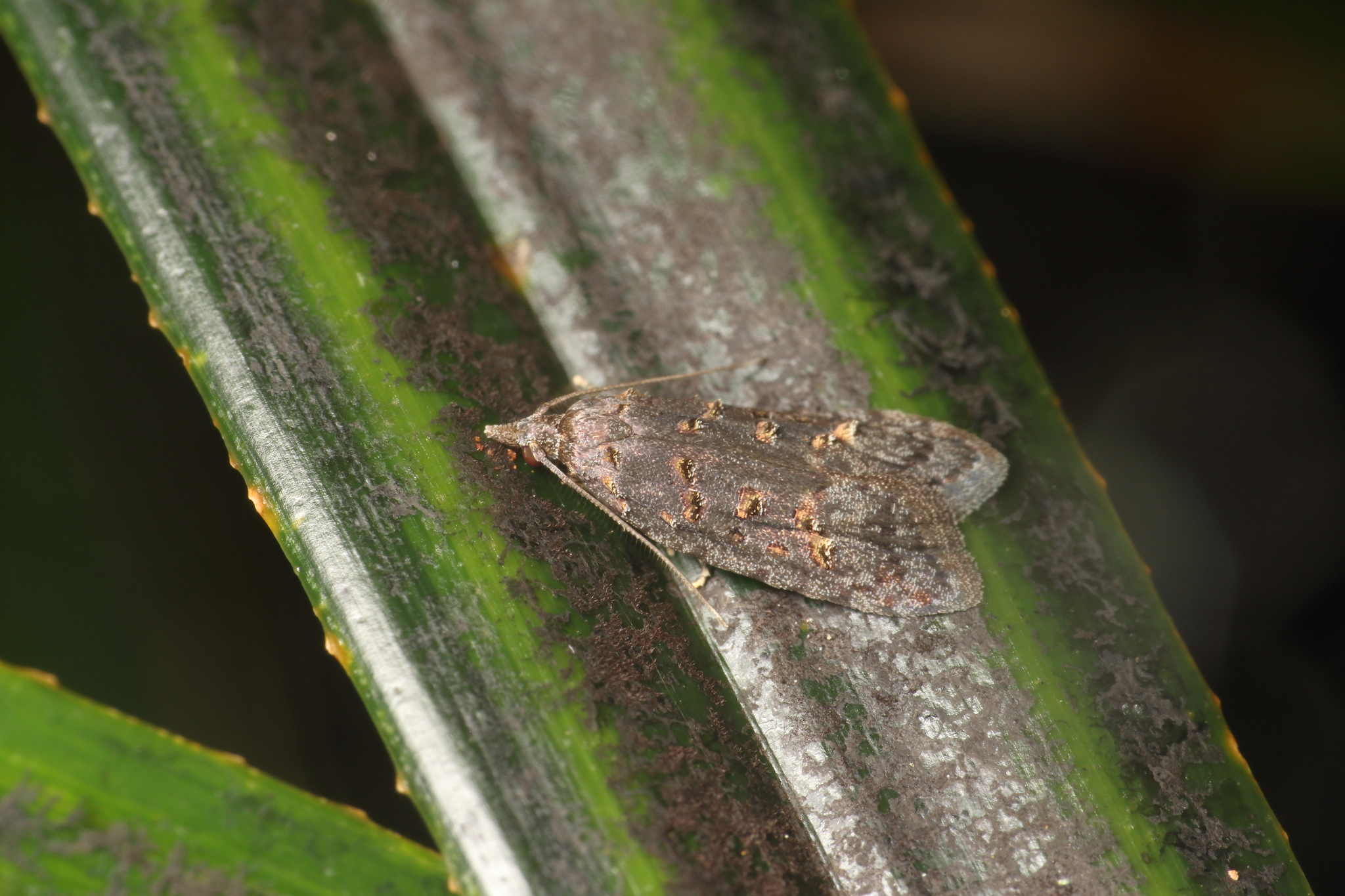

Scientific classification
- Kingdom: Animalia
- Phylum: Arthropoda
- Class: Insecta
- Order: Lepidoptera
- Family: Carposinidae
- Genus: Heterocrossa
- Species: H. iophaea

Binomial name
- Heterocrossa iophaea Meyrick, 1907

Synonyms
- Carposina iophaea (Meyrick, 1907); Heterocrossa thalamota Meyrick, 1909; Carposina thalamota (Meyrick, 1909)

= Heterocrossa iophaea =

Species of moth

Heterocrossa iophaea is a species of moth in the family Carposinidae. It is endemic to New Zealand and has been observed in both the North and South Islands. This species inhabits native forest. The larvae feed on the seeds of the mataī tree, Prumnopitys taxifolia. Adults are on the wing from October to February. They are nocturnal and are attracted to light. During the day, the adult moths rest on the trunks of trees or hide among the twigs and leaves on the ground.

== Taxonomy ==
This species was described by Edward Meyrick in 1907 using material collected by Alfred Philpott at Invercargill. In 1922, Meyrick classified Heterocrossa as a synonym of the genus Carposina. George Hudson, following Meyrick, discussed and illustrated this species under the name Carposina iophaea in his 1928 publication The Butterflies and Moths of New Zealand. In 1978, Elwood Zimmerman argued that the genus Heterocrassa should not be a synonym of Carposina as the genitalia of the species within the genus Heterocrassa are distinctive. In 1988, John S. Dugdale assigned the species back to the genus Heterocrossa. He also synonymised Heterocrossa thalamota with Heterocrossa iophaea. The male lectotype specimen is held at the Natural History Museum, London.

== Description ==
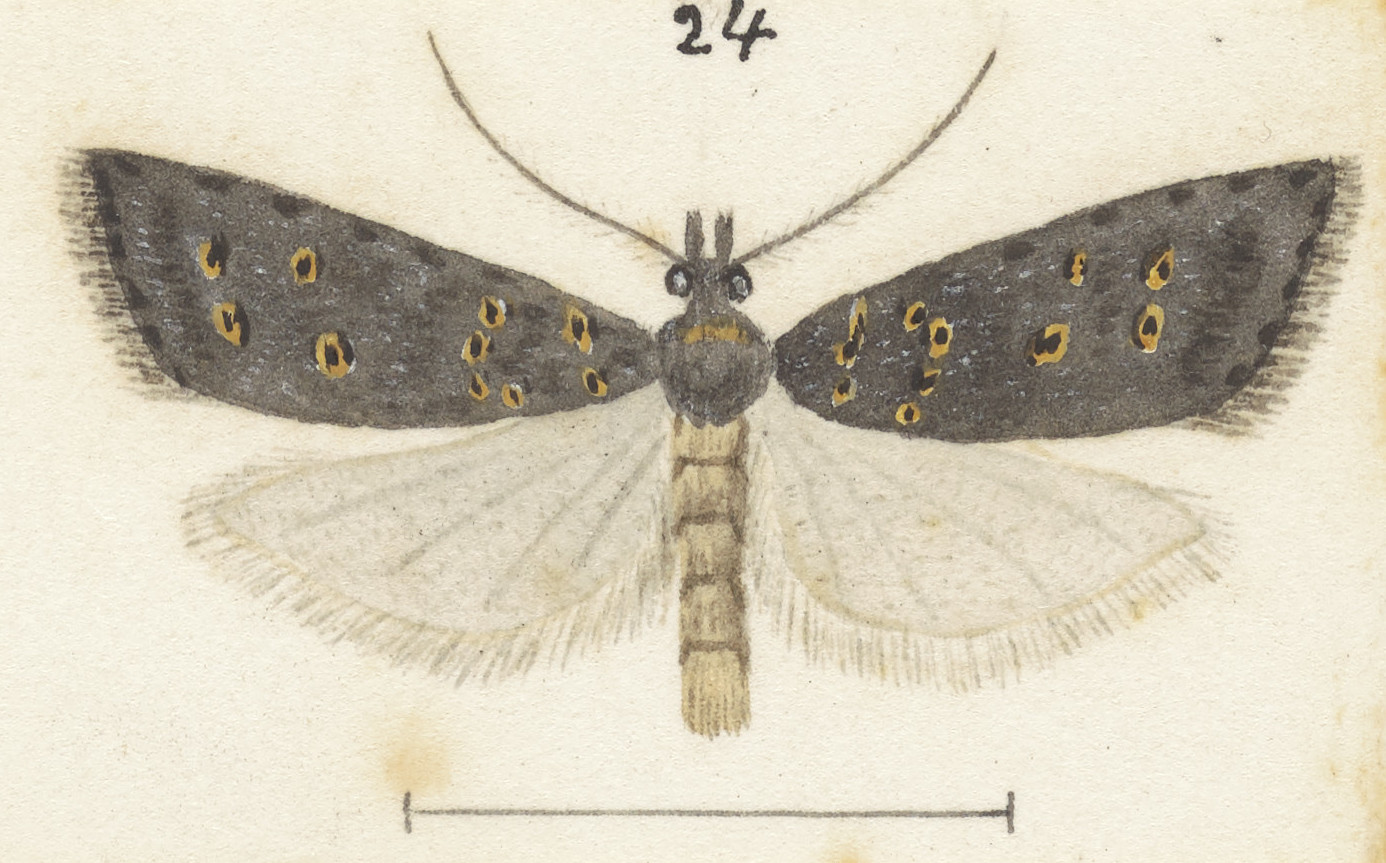
Illustration of H. iophaea.

This species was described by Meyrick as follows:

♀. 18–19 mm. Head, palpi, and thorax dark fuscous irrorated with whitish, face and palpi internally pale ochreous, palpi 4. Abdomen grey, two basal segments whitish-ochreous. Forewings elongate, narrow, costa gently arched, apex round-pointed, termen almost straight, oblique; dark fuscous irrorated with whitish, sometimes more or less mixed with pale ochreous; a series of small dark spots along costa; tufts brownish-ochreous suffusedly edged with black and posteriorly margined with whitish, viz., two near base sometimes surrounded with ochreous suffusion, a transverse angulated series beyond 1/4, and five arranged round middle of disc, enclosed space sometimes blackish; a more or less defined angulated dark subterminal line: cilia rather dark fuscous irrorated with whitish. Hind-wings grey: cilia whitish-grey.

Meyrick regarded this species as the darkest coloured amongst the genus.

== Distribution ==
This species is endemic to New Zealand. As well as the type locality of Invercargill, this species has also occurred in Wyndham, in the Peel Forest in Canterbury, Waiho Gorge in Westland, and Puhi Puhi in Marlborough. Specimens have also been collected in the North Island in locations such as at Whakapapa, Whangārei, Hawkes Bay, Waimarino in the Bay of Plenty region and Price's Bush in the Tararua Range.

== Habitat and host species ==
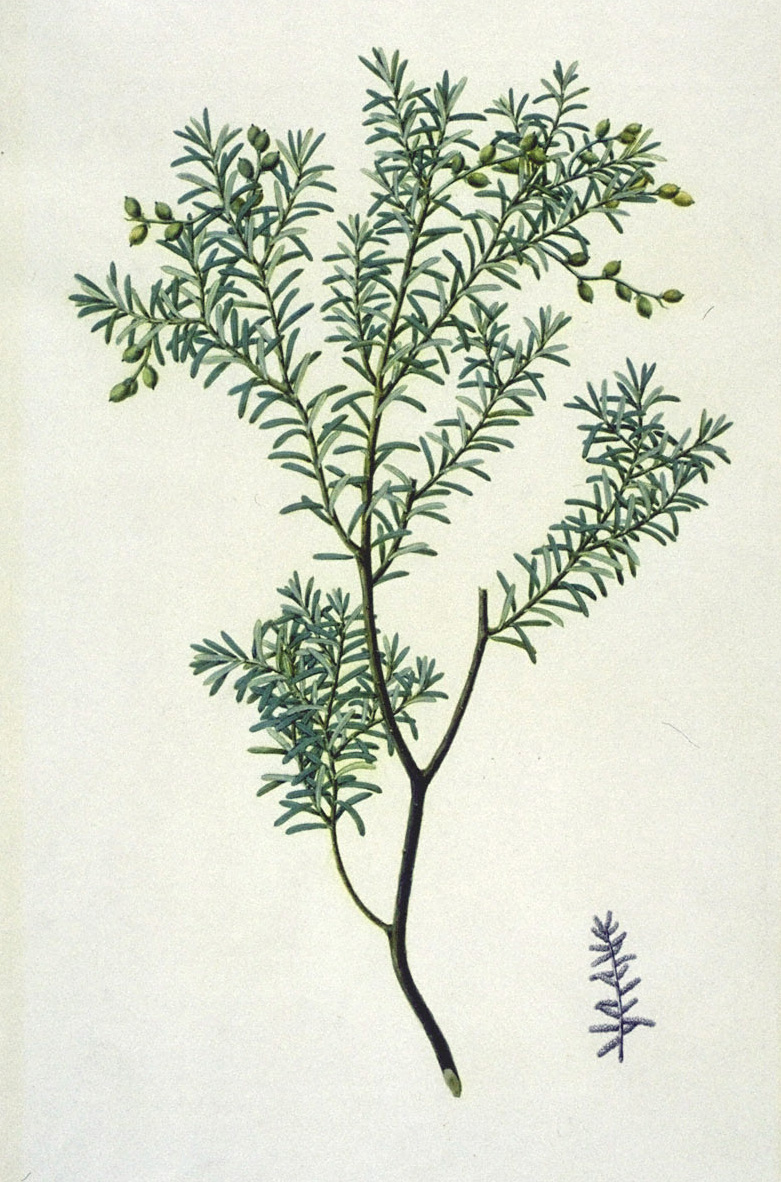
Mataī tree – host plant of Heterocrossa iophaea larvae

This species is found in native forest habitat. The larvae feed on the immature seeds of the mataī tree, Prumnopitys taxifolia. As the seeds mature the larvae switch to eating the sugar-rich outer wall tissues of the seed before pupating.

== Biology and behaviour ==
Adult moths are on the wing between October and February. They rest on the trunks of trees or alternatively hide among the twigs and leaves on the ground. The manner in which the adult moth folds its wings assists it in finding hiding places. They are attracted to light. They have also been collected through the beating of native vegetation.
