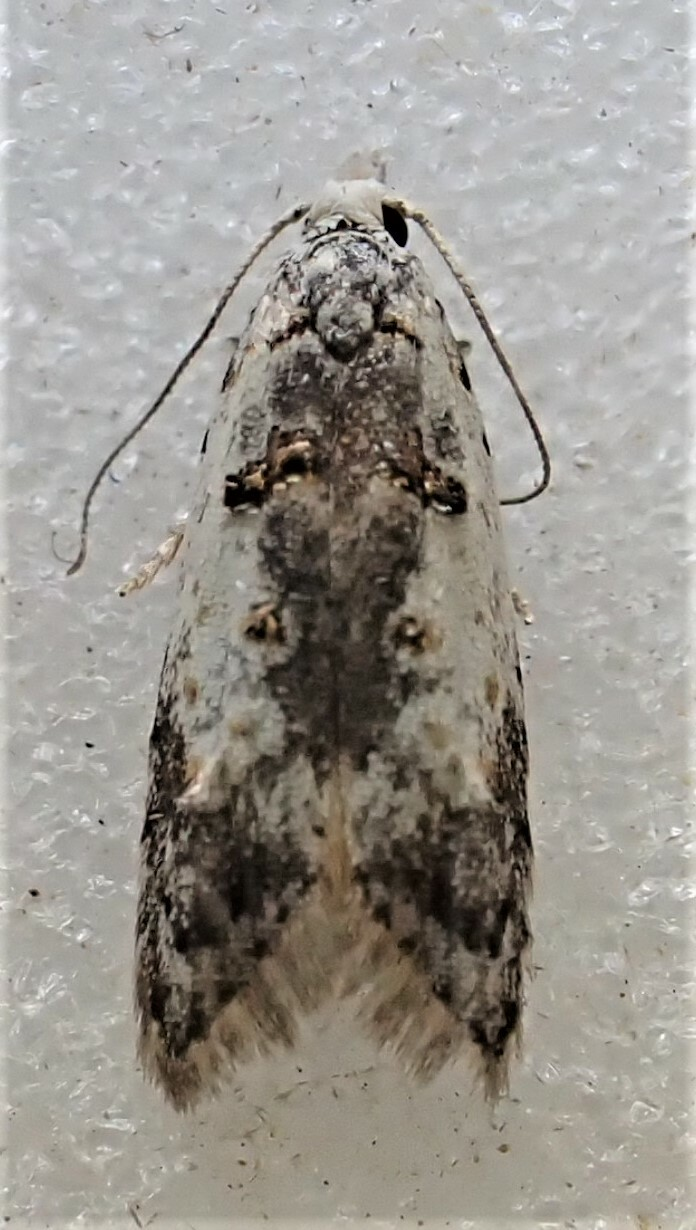

Scientific classification
- Kingdom: Animalia
- Phylum: Arthropoda
- Clade: Pancrustacea
- Class: Insecta
- Order: Lepidoptera
- Family: Carposinidae
- Genus: Heterocrossa
- Species: H. contactella

Binomial name
- Heterocrossa contactella (Walker, 1866)

Synonyms
- Tinea contactella Walker, 1866; Carposina amalodes Meyrick, 1911; Carposina contactella (Walker, 1866)

= Heterocrossa contactella =

Species of moth endemic to New Zealand

Heterocrossa contactella is a species of moth in the family Carposinidae. It is endemic to New Zealand and can be observed in both the North and South Islands. The preferred habitat of this species is native forest and scrub, especially where Leptospermum shrubs are found. Adults are on the wing in December and January.

== Taxonomy ==
This species was described by Francis Walker in 1866 using material collected in Nelson by T. R. Oxley in 1860 and named Tinea contactella. In 1905 Edward Meyrick placed this species within the genus Heterocrossa. In 1911, thinking he was describing a new species, Edward Meyrick named the moth Carposina amalodes. In 1922 Meyrick listed Heterocrossa as a synonym for Carposina. George Hudson, in his 1928 publication The Butterflies and Moths of New Zealand, discusses this species under both the names Carposina contactella and Carposina amalodes. In 1978 Elwood Zimmerman argued that the genus Heterocrassa should not be a synonym of Carposina as the genitalia of the species within the genus Heterocrassa are distinctive. In 1988 John S. Dugdale synonymised the name Carposina amalodes and assigned the species to the genus Heterocrossa. This placement was followed by the New Zealand Inventory of Biodiversity. The lectotype specimen is held at the Natural History Museum, London.

== Description ==
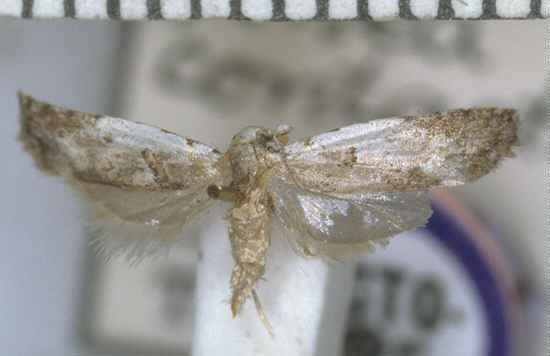
Lectotype specimen of H. contactella.

Meyrick described the species as follows:

♀︎. 14–15 mm. Head white. Palpi 2 1/2, white, lower longitudinal half blackish. Antennas white, obscurely ringed with fuscous. Thorax whitish-ochreous mixed with dark grey, collar and patagia white. Abdomen pale greyish-ochreous. Fore-wings elongate, narrow, costa moderately arched, apex round-pointed, termen very oblique, almost straight, rounded beneath; grey, irregularly irrorated with dark grey and white; a broad irregular-edged white suffusion extending along anterior half of costa, and reaching 2/3 across wing; three or four small black dots on costa anteriorly, second forming a short strigula; a narrow oblique-transverse pale ochreous spot edged with black below middle at 1/3; a black dot above middle of disc, and a small pale ochreous sometimes blackish-mixed spot below it; three small faint whitish-ochreous spots arranged in a triangle in disc beyond middle; all these ochreous spots are ringed with white suffusion; an undefined angulated dark subterminal shade, marked with black on veins; a series of blackish dots on posterior half of costa and termen : cilia light grey irrorated with white, basal half obscurely barred with whitish. Hind-wings grey, paler anteriorly; cilia whitish.

== Distribution ==
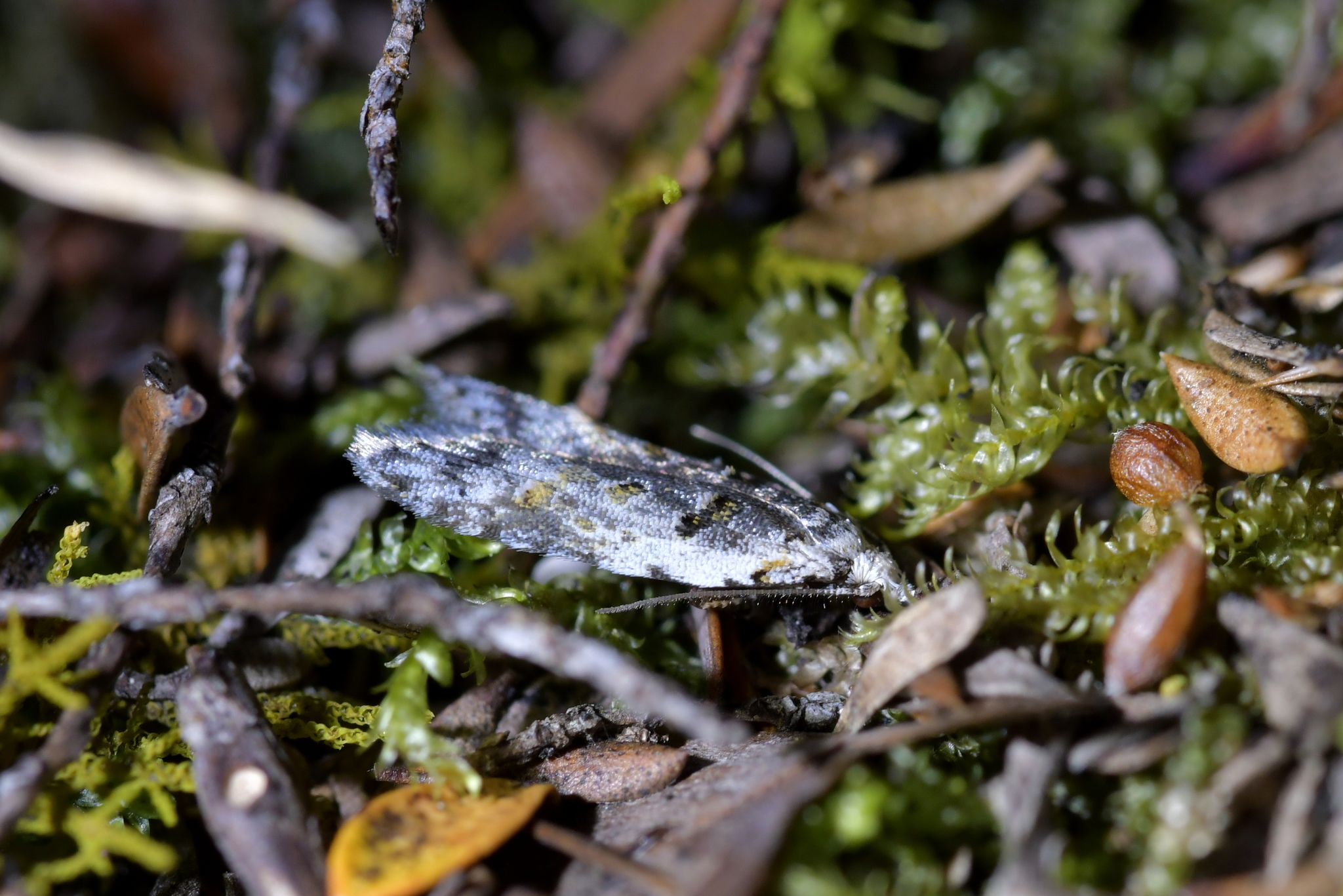
Heterocrossa contactella observed in forest near Saint Arnaud, New Zealand

This species is endemic to New Zealand. This species can be found in both the North and South Islands and has been observed in the Auckland region, Whanganui River, Paekākāriki, Wellington, Ōtira River, Ida Valley, Queenstown, Invercargill and Bluff. Hudson regarded it as uncommon.

== Biology and behaviour ==
Adults of this species is on the wing in October, December and January.

== Habitat ==
H. contactella prefers light forest and scrub habitat, especially where Leptospermum shrubs are found.
