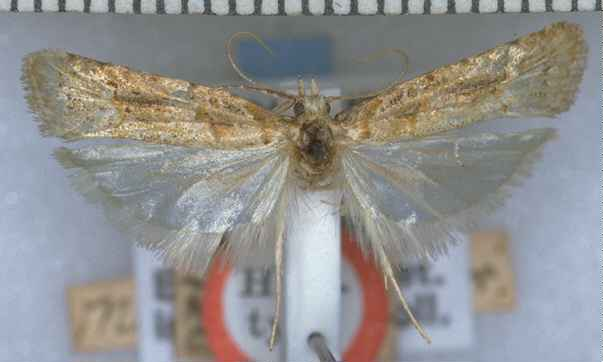
- Male holotype

Scientific classification
- Kingdom: Animalia
- Phylum: Arthropoda
- Class: Insecta
- Order: Lepidoptera
- Family: Carposinidae
- Genus: Heterocrossa
- Species: H. morbida

Binomial name
- Heterocrossa morbida (Meyrick, 1912)

Synonyms
- Carposina morbida Meyrick, 1912

= Heterocrossa morbida =

Species of moth endemic to New Zealand

Heterocrossa morbida is a moth of the Carposinidae family. It was described by Edward Meyrick in 1912 and is endemic to New Zealand. This species has been observed in both the North and South Islands. Adults are on the wing from August until February and are said to frequent clumps of Hoheria lyallii.

== Taxonomy ==
This species was first described by Edward Meyrick in 1912 using a male specimen collected by George Hudson on the banks of the Routeburn at the head of Lake Wakatipu in February and named Carposina morbida. Hudson, in his 1928 publication The Butterflies and Moths of New Zealand, discussed this species under that name. Alfred Philpott studied the male genitalia of this species in 1928. In 1978 Elwood Zimmerman argued that the genus Heterocrassa should not be a synonym of Carposina as the genitalia of the species within the genus Heterocrassa are distinctive. In 1988 John S. Dugdale assigned the species to the genus Heterocrossa. The holotype specimen is held at the Natural History Museum, London.

== Description ==
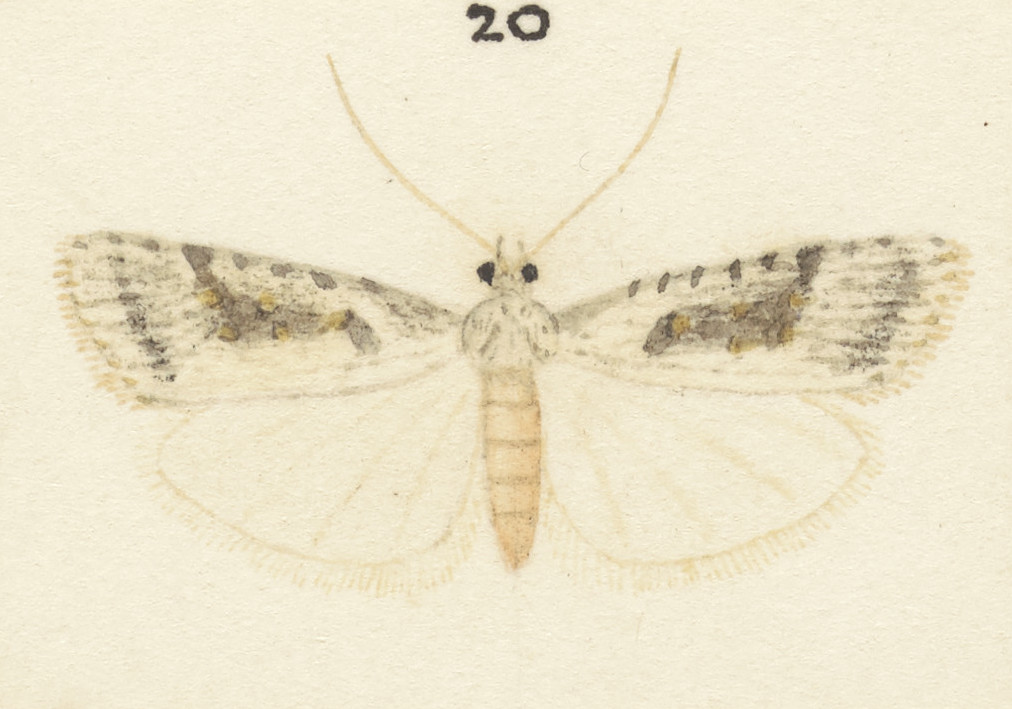
Illustration of female

Meyrick described H. morbida as follows:

♂. 26 mm. Head ochreous-whitish. Palpi 2 1/2, porrected, ochreous-whitish, basal half suffused with dark olive-grey. Antennal ciliations 4. Thorax ochreous-whitish, shoulders with an ochreous spot. Abdomen ochreous-whitish. Forewings elongate, rather narrow, posteriorly somewhat dilated, costa gently arched, apex obtuse, termen straight, rather oblique; silvery-whitish-ochreous, irregularly strewn with ochreous scales, costa and dorsum somewhat sprinkled with grey; a small brownish-ochreous basal patch, edge parallel to termen; six small shots of grey suffusion on costa between this and apex; tufts brownish-ochreous, posteriorly white—viz., one beneath costa at 1/3, preceded by a dash of black irroration, one beneath this towards dorsum, a larger one in disc beyond these, preceded by a black dash on submedian fold, two towards costa in and beyond middle edged with black beneath, one below middle edged with black above, and a ridge on transverse vein, irregularly edged with black anteriorly, between these in middle of disc is an elongate patch of grey suffusion; some scattered black irroration crossing wing at 5/6; cilia whitish, with two greyish shades. Hindwings and cilia whitish. Under-surface of forewings and hindwings largely clothed on anterior half with modified pale yellow-ochreous scales, on forewings anteriorly suffused with grey.

Meyrick pointed out that the male of this species is only likely to be confused with H. exochana but differs, as the males of this latter species have much longer porrected palpi.

== Distribution ==
H. morbida is endemic to New Zealand. Other than the type locality, this species has been observed in the Auckland and Wellington regions in the North Island, and at Mount Hutt, Arthur's Pass, the Homer tunnel area and Waiho Gorge in the South Island.

== Behaviour ==
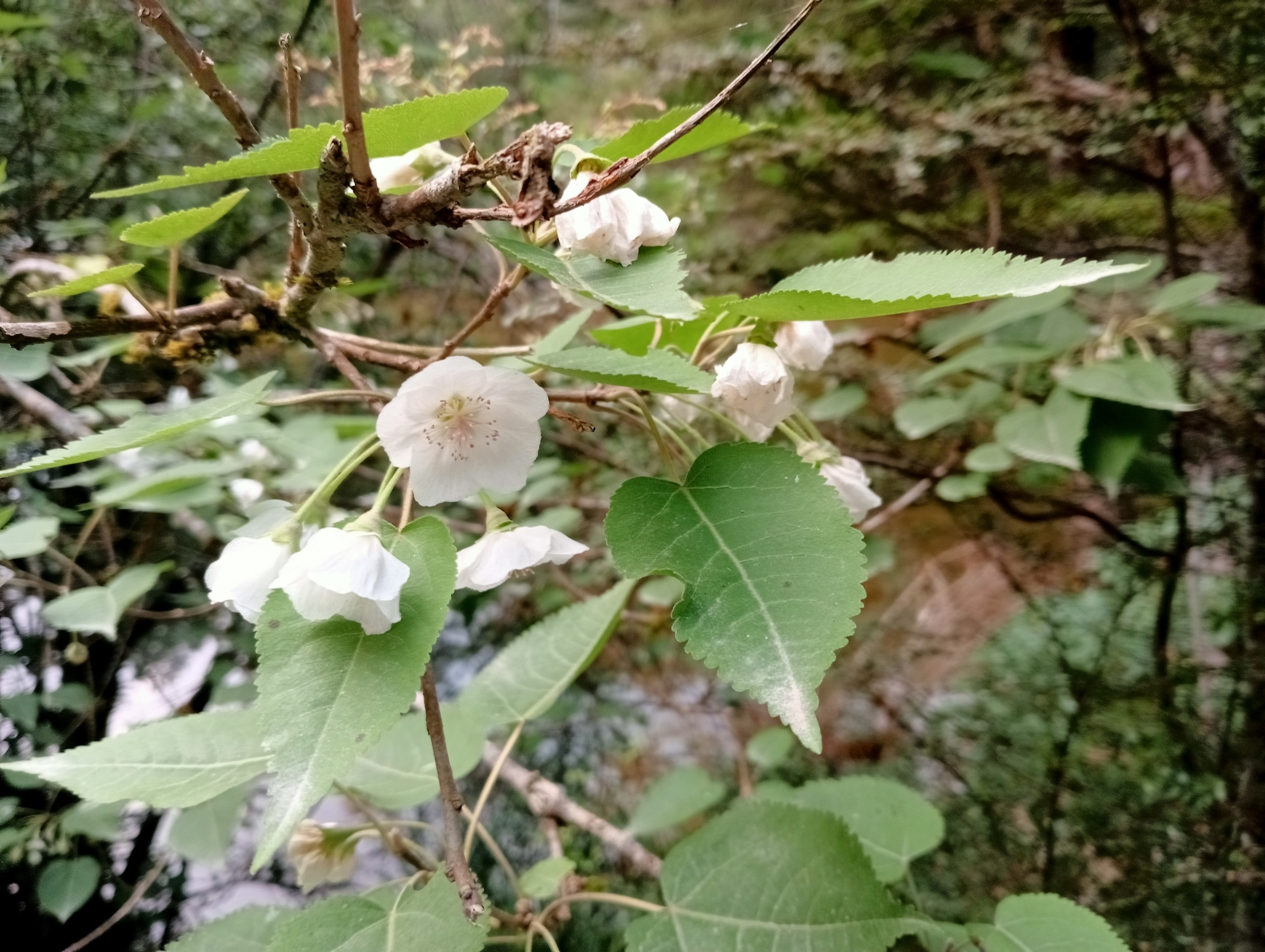
H. lyallii.

Hudson stated that the adults frequent clumps of Hoheria lyallii. Adults have been observed on the wing from August until February.
