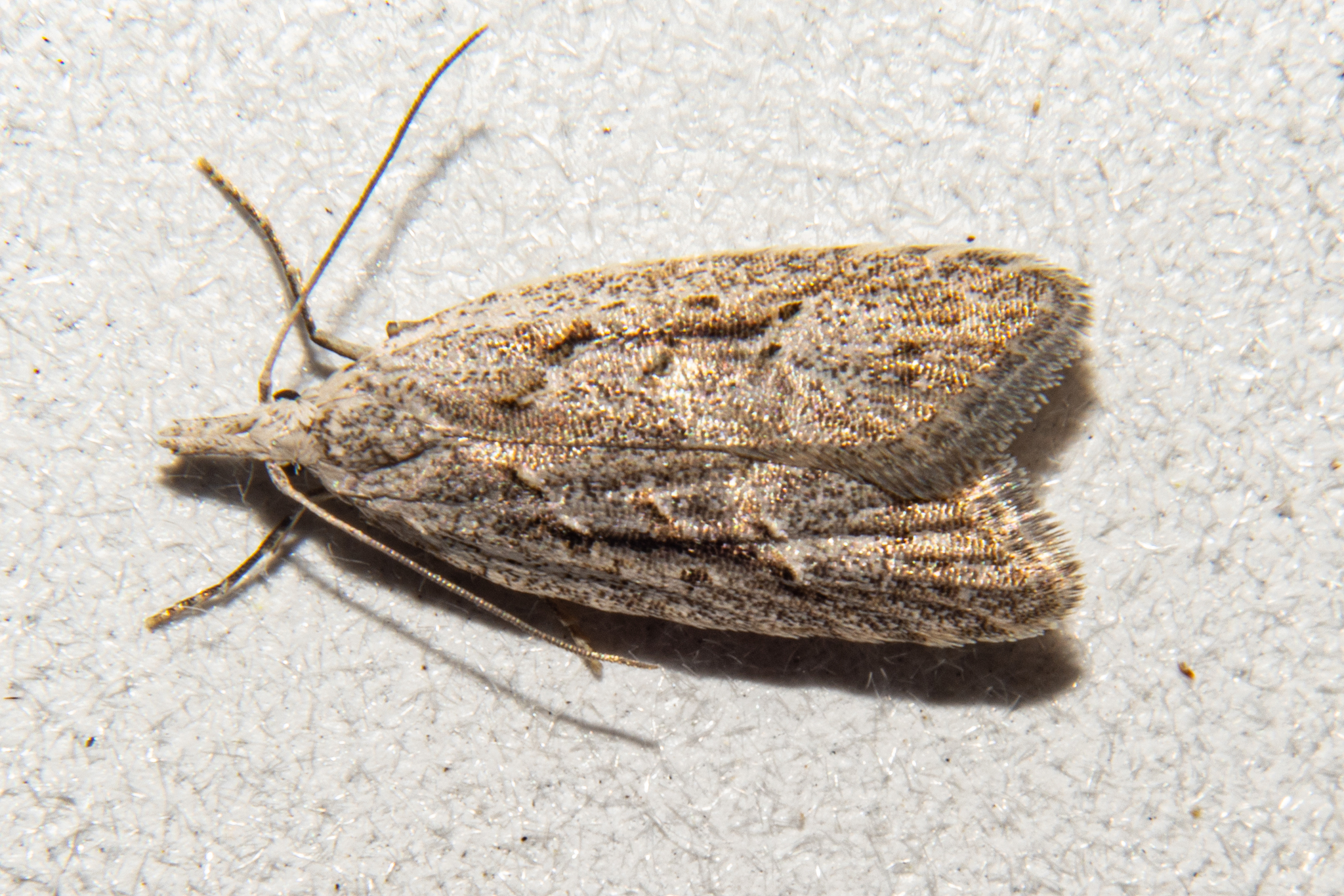

Scientific classification
- Kingdom: Animalia
- Phylum: Arthropoda
- Class: Insecta
- Order: Lepidoptera
- Family: Carposinidae
- Genus: Heterocrossa
- Species: H. cryodana

Binomial name
- Heterocrossa cryodana Meyrick, 1885

Synonyms
- Carposina cryodana (Meyrick, 1885)

= Heterocrossa cryodana =

Species of moth

Heterocrossa cryodana is a species of moth in the family Carposinidae. It is endemic to New Zealand and is found in the southern parts of the South Island as well as at Codfish Island / Whenua Hou. This moth is associated with plants in the Leptospermum genus. Adults are on the wing from September until January.

== Taxonomy ==
This species was described by Edward Meyrick in 1885 using material collected in Dunedin and named Heterocrossa cryodana. In 1922 Meyrick synonymised Heterocrossa with Carposina. George Hudson, in his 1928 publication The Butterflies and Moths of New Zealand, discusses this species under the name Carposina cryodana. Alfred Philpott studied the male genitalia of this species in 1928. In 1978 Elwood Zimmerman argued that the genus Heterocrassa should not be a synonym of Carposina as the genitalia of the species within the genus Heterocrassa are distinctive. In 1988 John S. Dugdale assigned the species back to the genus Heterocrossa. The lectotype specimen is held at the Natural History Museum, London.

== Description ==
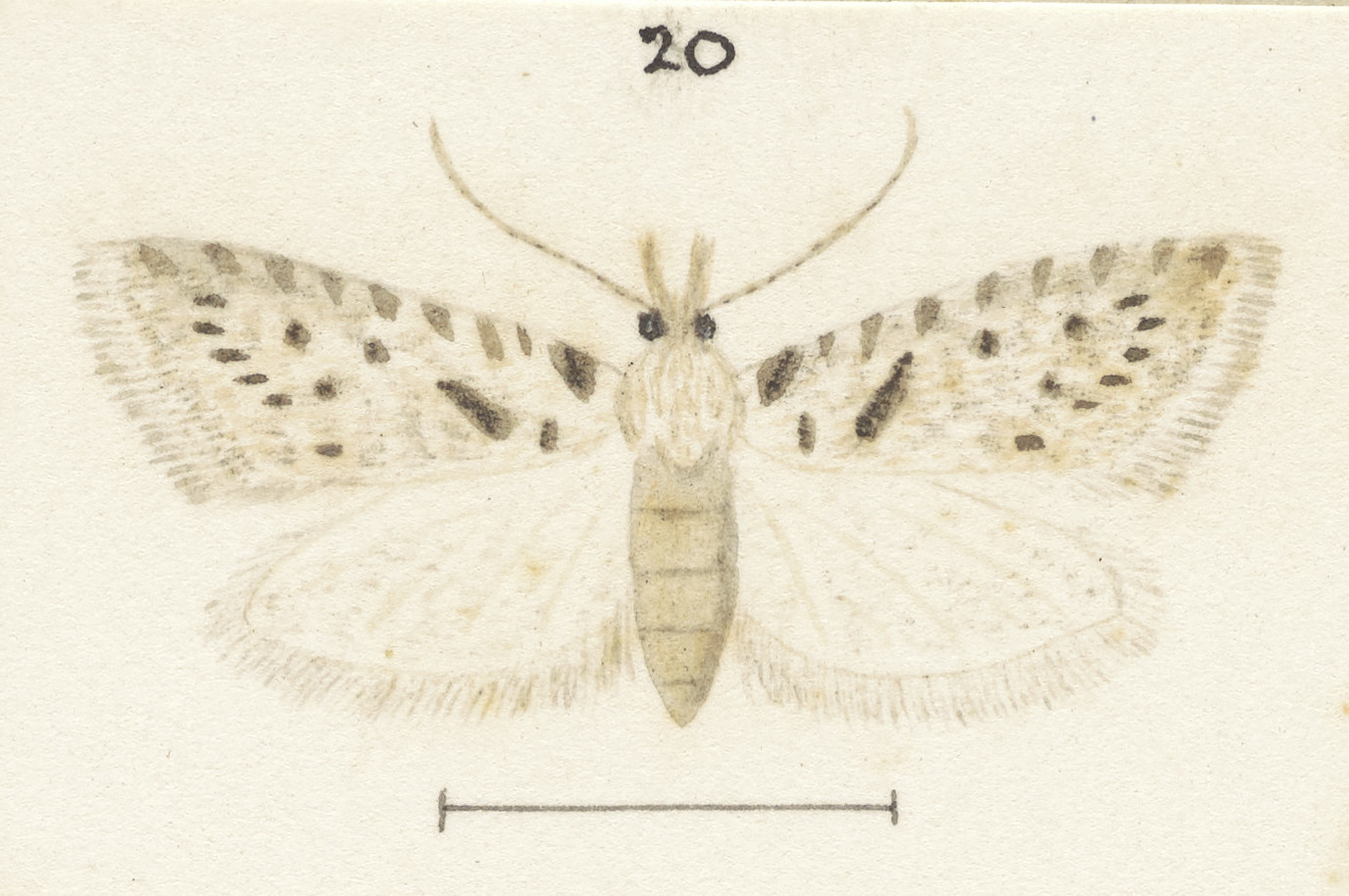
Illustration of female.

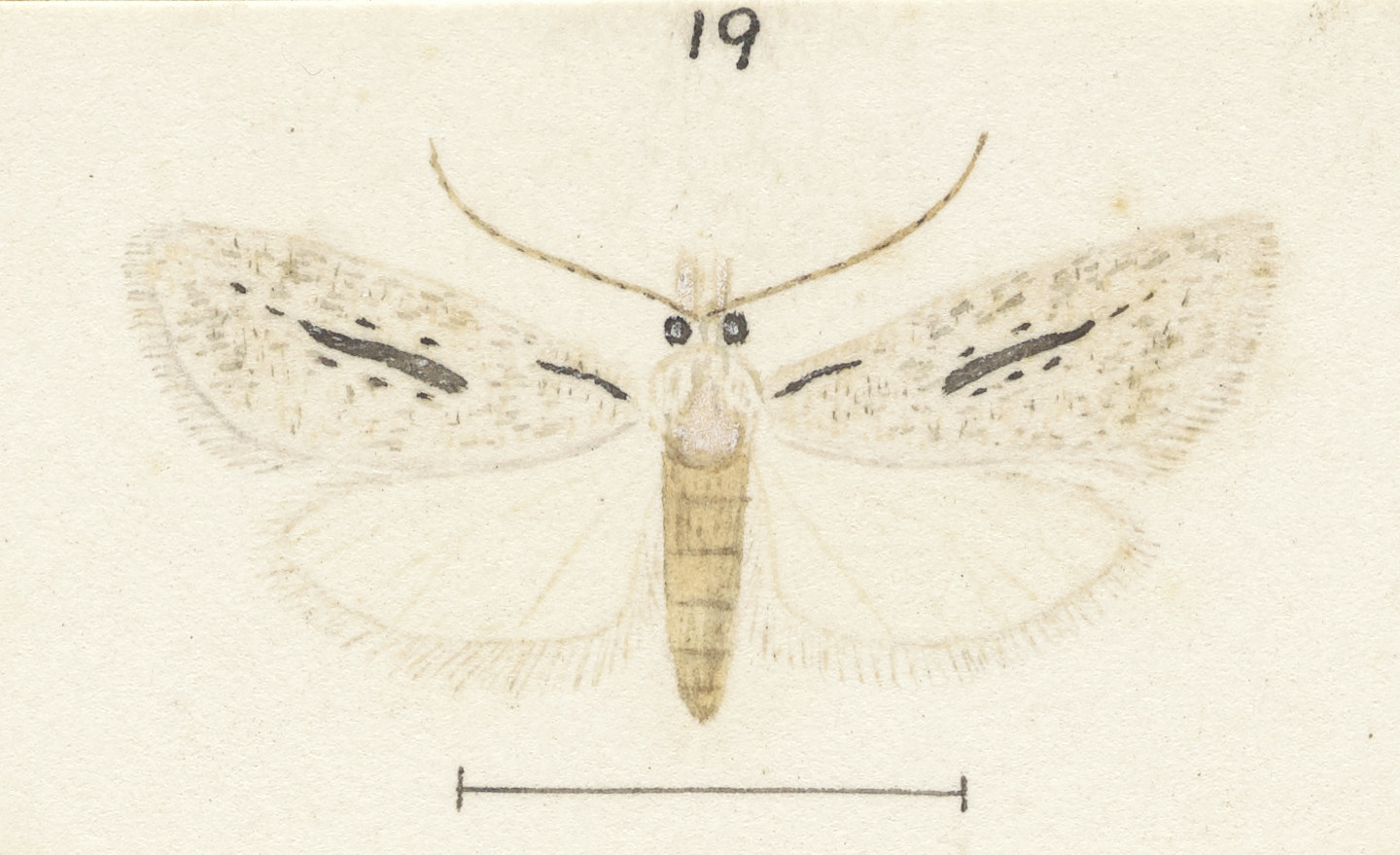
Illustration of male.

This species was described by Meyrick as follows:

Male, female. — 16-17 mm. Head and thorax white, slightly speckled with grey. Palpi in male moderate, in female long; lower half dark fuscous, upper half white. Antennae whitish. Abdomen and legs ochreous-whitish, anterior and middle pair dark fuscous except apex of joints. Fore-wings elongate, narrow, tolerably oblong, costa moderately arched, apex round-pointed, hindmargin straight, very oblique; white, densely irrorated with pale fuscous-grey; a short black streak from base beneath costa; tufts preceded by a few black scales; sometimes a thick irregular blackish longitudinal streak in disc, extending from 1/4—2/3; cilia white, densely irrorated with pale grey. Hindwings grey-whitish; cilia whitish.

This species can be distinguished from other species in the same genus by the short black subcostal streak.

== Distribution ==
This species is endemic to New Zealand. It has been collected in Dunedin and Invercargill and Codfish Island / Whenua Hou.

== Biology and behaviour ==
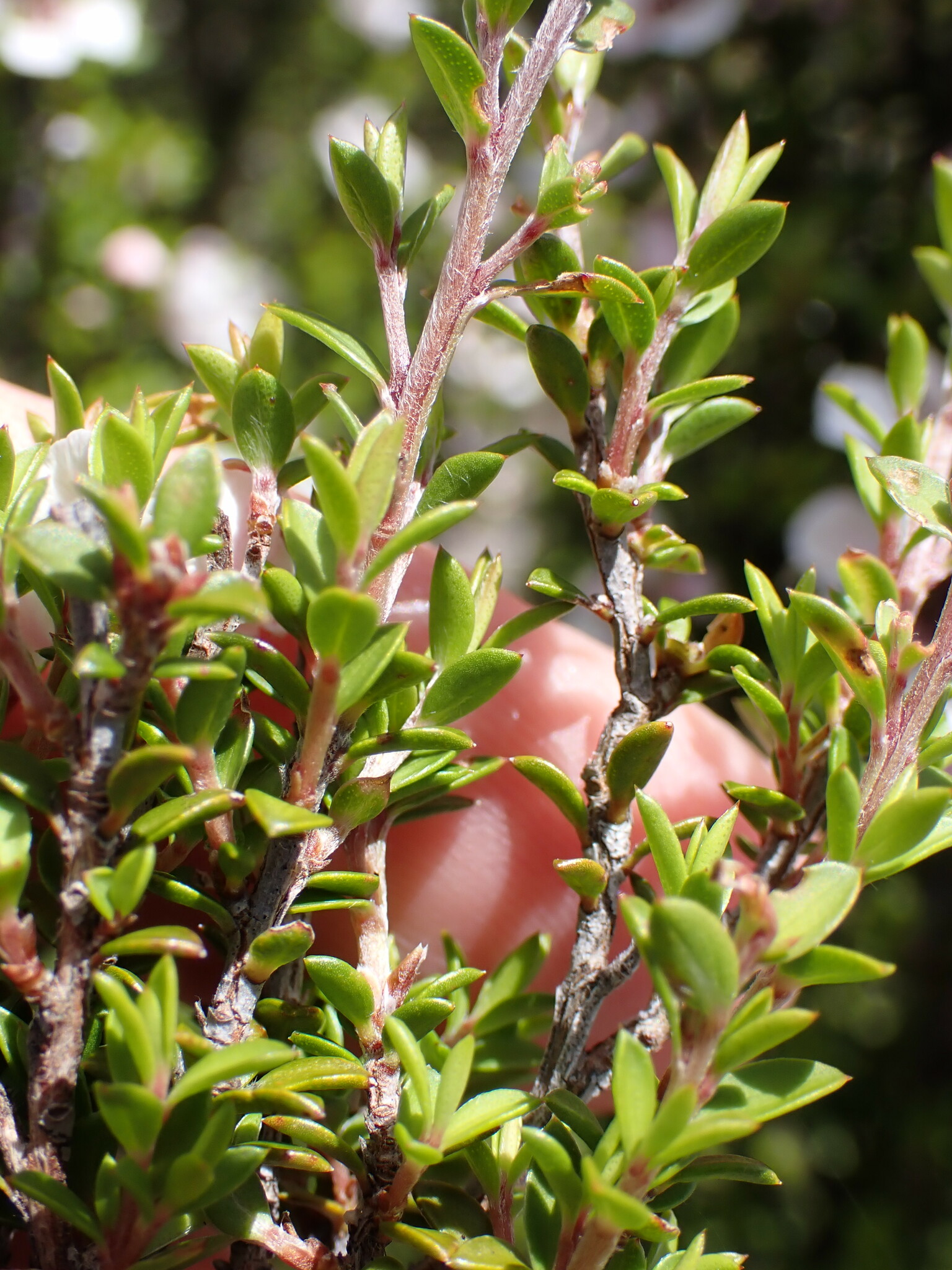
Associated plant in the genus Leptospermum.

This species is on the wing in September until January. It is associated with Leptospermum species. Larvae of the species have been found on fruits.
