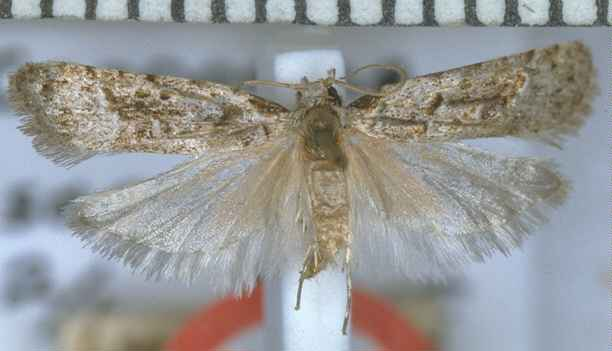
- Male holotype

Scientific classification
- Kingdom: Animalia
- Phylum: Arthropoda
- Class: Insecta
- Order: Lepidoptera
- Family: Carposinidae
- Genus: Heterocrossa
- Species: H. sarcanthes

Binomial name
- Heterocrossa sarcanthes (Meyrick, 1918)

Synonyms
- Carposina sarcanthes Meyrick, 1918

= Heterocrossa sarcanthes =

Species of moth endemic to New Zealand

Heterocrossa sarcanthes is a moth of the Carposinidae family first described by Edward Meyrick in 1918. It is endemic to New Zealand and has been observed in Wellington. The adults of this species is similar in appearance to H. adreptella but can be distinguished from that species as H. sarcanthes has a pale pinkish-ochreous colour to the basal half of the hindwings.

== Taxonomy ==
This species was first described by Edward Meyrick in 1918 using a specimen collected by George Hudson in Wellington and named Carposina sarcanthes. Hudson discussed this species in his book The butterflies and moths of New Zealand. In 1988 J. S. Dugdale placed this species in the genus Heterocrossa. The male holotype is held at the Natural History Museum, London.

== Description ==
The wingspan is about 15 mm. The head is white, with a few grey specks and the thorax is grey with a curved white median bar. The abdomen is pale pinkish-ochreous. The forewings are elongate, rather narrow, posteriorly somewhat dilated, the costa gently arched, the apex obtuse and the termen straight. They are pale grey, irregularly mixed with white and somewhat sprinkled with dark fuscous. There is a semi-oval blackish blotch on base of the costa and seven dots of blackish irroration on the costa between this and the apex. There are also two small round grey spots edged beneath with blackish and circled with white beneath the costa towards the middle. The hindwings are whitish-grey, but the basal half is suffused with pale pinkish-ochreous.

This species is similar in appearance to H. adreptella but can be distinguished from that species as H. sarcanthes has a pale pinkish-ochreous colour to the basal half of the hindwings.

== Distribution ==
This species is endemic to New Zealand. It has been collected in Wellington.
