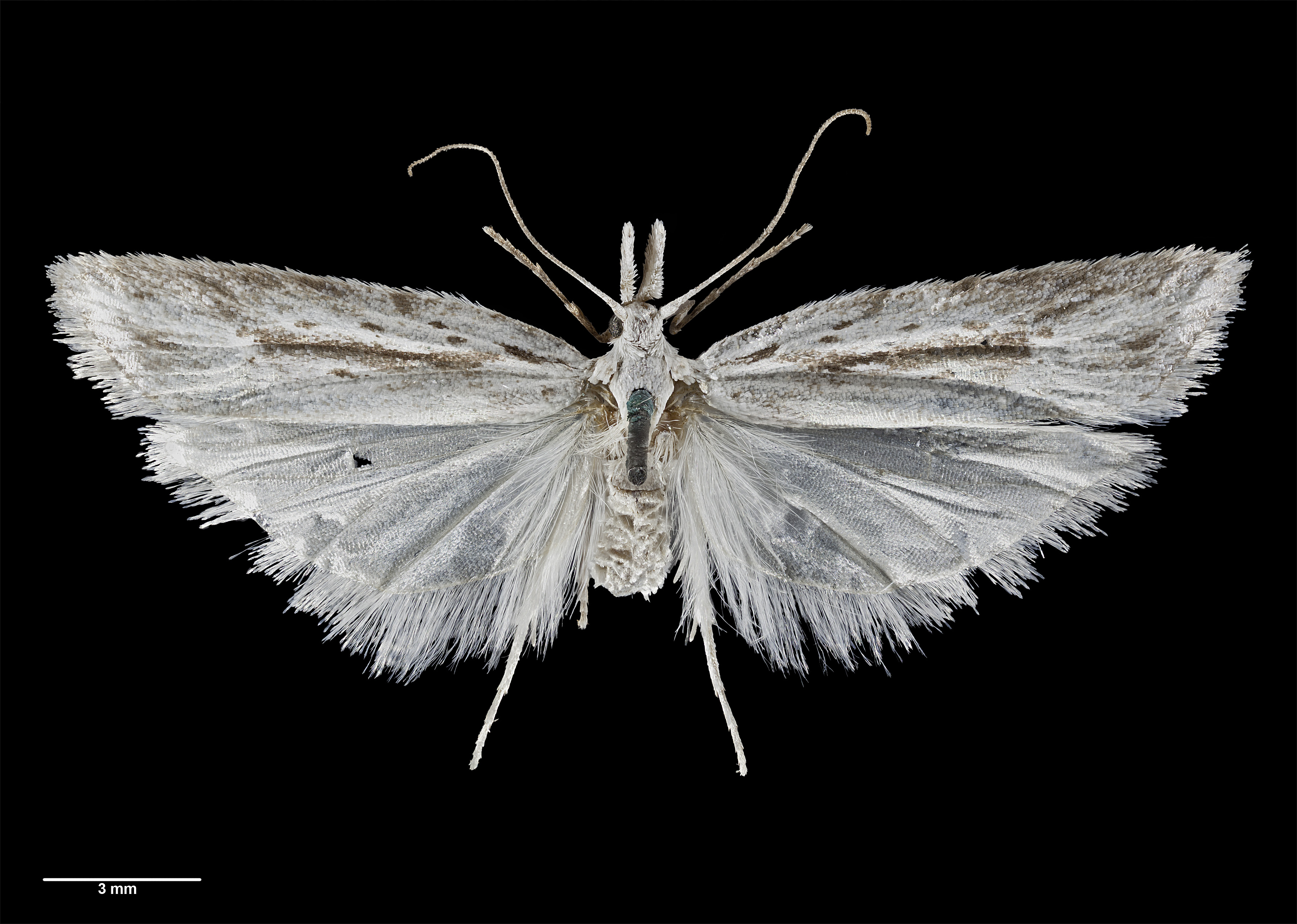
- Heterocrossa sanctimonea

Scientific classification
- Kingdom: Animalia
- Phylum: Arthropoda
- Class: Insecta
- Order: Lepidoptera
- Family: Carposinidae
- Genus: Heterocrossa; Meyrick, 1882

= Heterocrossa =

Genus of moths

Heterocrossa is a genus of moths in the Carposinidae family. It is endemic to New Zealand. This genus was previously regarded as a synonym of the genus Carposina. However Elwood C. Zimmerman in Insects of Hawaii (1978, p. 797) removed Heterocrossa from synonymy with Carposina. Zimmerman argued that as the genitalia of Heterocrossa and Carposina are distinct, Heterocrossa should not be regarded as a synonym of Carposina. This was agreed with by John S. Dugdale in his annotated catalogue of New Zealand Lepidoptera.

== Species ==
Species contained in the genus include:

- Heterocrossa adreptella (Walker, 1864)
- Heterocrossa canescens (Philpott, 1930)
- Heterocrossa contactella (Walker, 1866)
- Heterocrossa cryodana Meyrick, 1885
- Heterocrossa epomiana Meyrick, 1885
- Heterocrossa eriphylla Meyrick, 1888
- Heterocrossa exochana Meyrick, 1888
- Heterocrossa gonosemana Meyrick, 1882
- Heterocrossa ignobilis (Philpott, 1930)
- Heterocrossa iophaea Meyrick, 1907
- Heterocrossa literata (Philpott, 1930)
- Heterocrossa maculosa (Philpott, 1927)
- Heterocrossa morbida (Meyrick, 1912)
- Heterocrossa philpotti Dugdale, 1971
- Heterocrossa rubophaga Dugdale, 1988
- Heterocrossa sanctimonea (Clarke, 1926)
- Heterocrossa sarcanthes (Meyrick, 1918)
