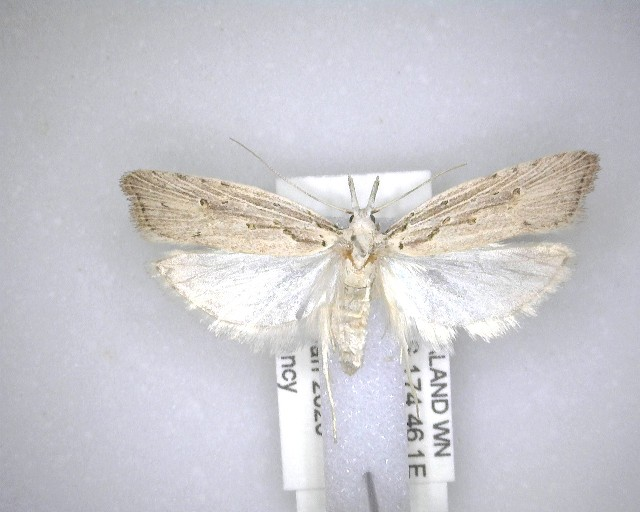

Scientific classification
- Kingdom: Animalia
- Phylum: Arthropoda
- Class: Insecta
- Order: Lepidoptera
- Family: Carposinidae
- Genus: Heterocrossa
- Species: H. exochana

Binomial name
- Heterocrossa exochana Meyrick, 1888

Synonyms
- Carposina exochana (Meyrick, 1888)

= Heterocrossa exochana =

Species of moth

Heterocrossa exochana is a species of moth in the family Carposinidae. It is endemic to New Zealand and has been observed in the North and South Islands. The larvae of this species feed on the fruits of Muehlenbeckia species. The adult is on the wing from September until May and are attracted to light.

== Taxonomy ==
This species was described by Edward Meyrick in 1888 using material he collected in Nelson in January. In 1922 Meyrick classified Heterocrossa as a synonym of the genus Carposina. George Hudson, following Meyrick, discussed and illustrated this species in his 1928 publication The Butterflies and Moths of New Zealand under the name Carposina exochana. Later that same year Alfred Philpott examined the genitalia of the males of the species. In 1978 Elwood Zimmerman argued that the genus Heterocrassa should not be a synonym of Carposina as the genitalia of the species within the genus Heterocrassa are distinctive. In 1988 John S. Dugdale assigned the species back to the genus Heterocrossa. The female holotype specimen is held at the Natural History Museum, London.

== Description ==
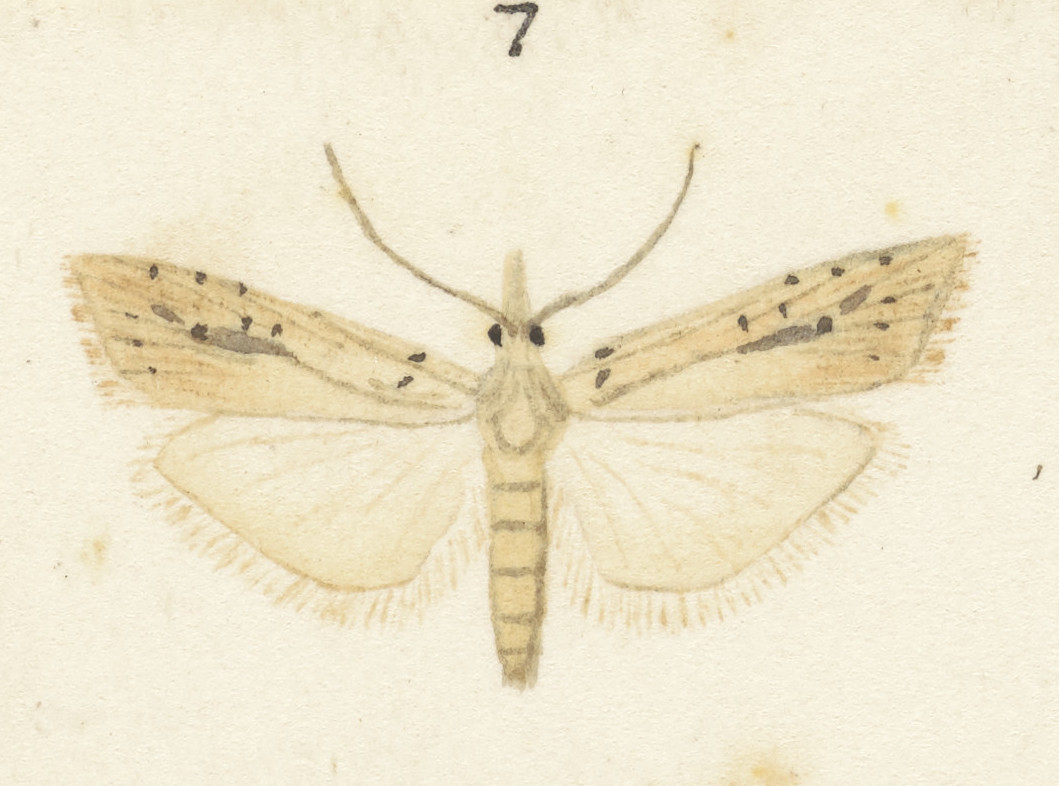
Illustration by G. Hudson.

This species was described by Meyrick as follows:

Female. — 21 mm. Head and thorax ochreous-white. Palpi with upper longitudinal half ochreous-white, lower dark fuscous. Antennas, abdomen, and legs ochreous-whitish, anterior legs suffused with dark fuscous. Forewings elongate, scarcely dilated, costa moderately arched, apex round-pointed, hind-margin faintly sinuate, rather strongly oblique; pale whitish-ochreous; about ten small irregular scattered black dots in disc; a subterminal series of irregular cloudy black dots, obsolete towards costa and inner margin : cilia pale whitish-ochreous. Hindwings and cilia ochreous-whitish.

H. exochana can possibly be confused with H. morbida but the male of H. exochana has much longer porrected palpi.

== Distribution ==
H. exochana is endemic to New Zealand and has been observed in both the North and South Islands. Other than its type locality of Nelson, H. exochana has been collected in Masterton, Wellington, Christchurch, Dunedin and Invercargill. The species has also been collected in Fiordland and Hawkes Bay. Hudson regarded it as an uncommon species.

== Biology and behaviour ==
The adults of this moth are on the wing from September to May. The adult moths are attracted to light.

== Host species ==
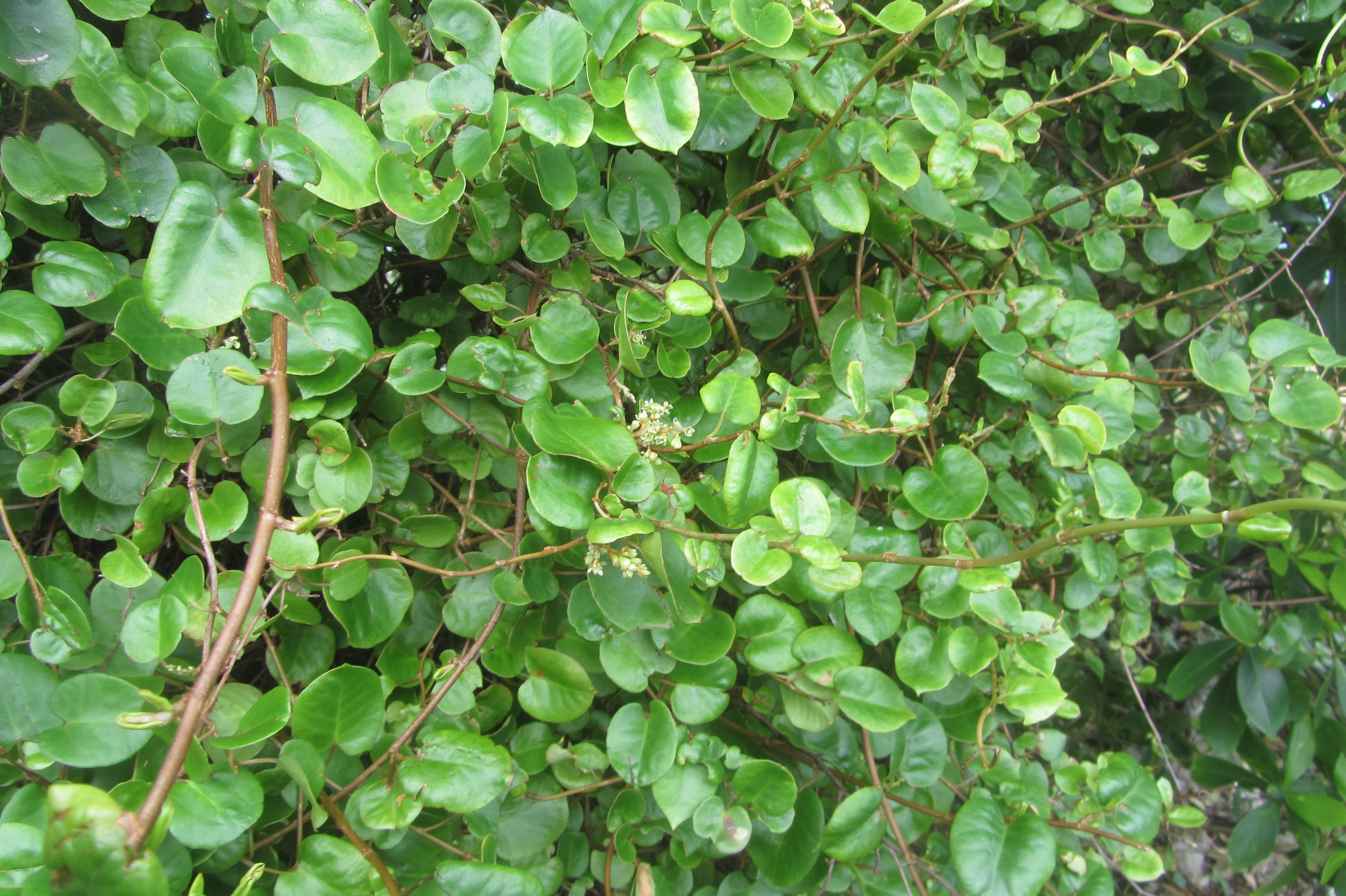
Larval host Muehlenbeckia australis.

The larvae feed on the fruits of Muehlenbeckia species.
