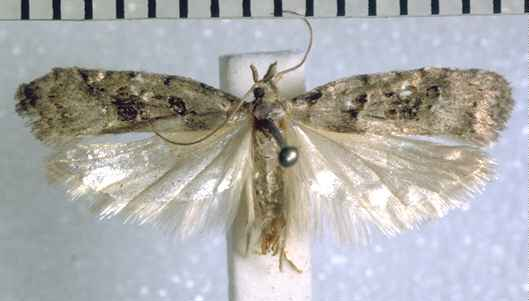
- Male holotype

Scientific classification
- Kingdom: Animalia
- Phylum: Arthropoda
- Class: Insecta
- Order: Lepidoptera
- Family: Carposinidae
- Genus: Heterocrossa
- Species: H. canescens

Binomial name
- Heterocrossa canescens (Philpott, 1930)

Synonyms
- Carposina canescens Philpott, 1930

= Heterocrossa canescens =

Species of moth endemic to New Zealand

Heterocrossa canescens is a species of moth in the family Carposinidae. It is endemic to New Zealand. This species has been observed in Aoraki / Mount Cook National Park and in the Southern Alps. The larvae of this species feed on the fruits and flowers of endemic to New Zealand species in the genus Gaultheria. Adult moths are on the wing in November and from January to March.

== Taxonomy ==
This species was described by Alfred Philpott in 1930 using material he collected in February at Governors Bush, Aoraki / Mount Cook National Park and originally named Carposina canescens. George Hudson discussed this species under that name in his 1939 book A supplement to the butterflies and moths of New Zealand. In 1978 Elwood Zimmerman argued that the genus Heterocrassa should not be a synonym of Carposina as the genitalia of the species in this genus are distinctive. Subsequently John S. Dugdale placed this species within the genus Heterocrossa. The holotype specimen is held at the Canterbury Museum.

== Description ==
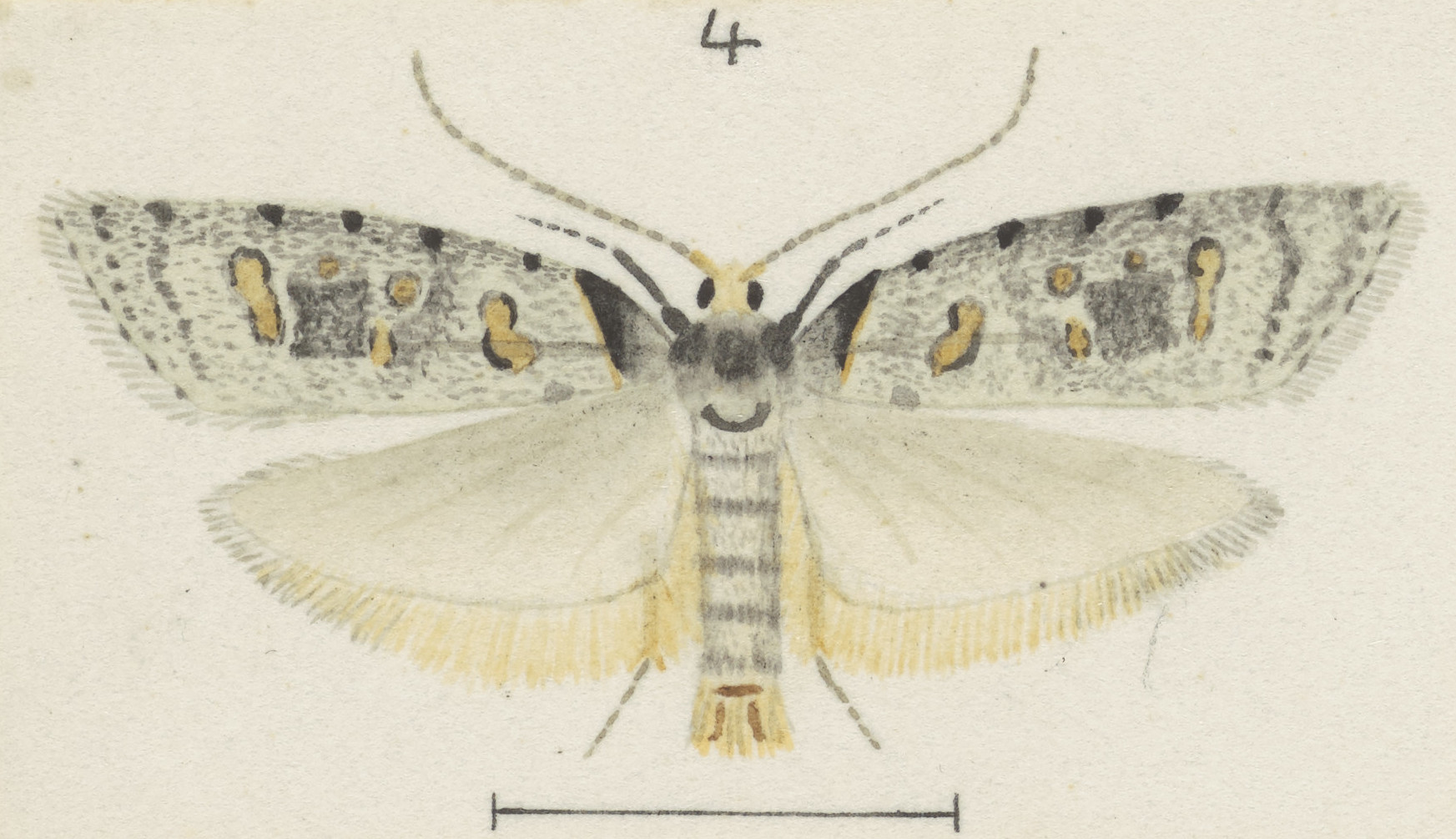
Illustration of species by George Hudson.

Philpott described the species as follows:

♂ ♀. 15–17 mm. Head, palpi and thorax whitish-grey. Antennae grey, ciliations in ♂ 4. Abdomen whitish-ochreous. Legs, anterior and middle pair fuscous, tarsi annulated with ochreous, posterior pair ochreous-white. Forewings, costa moderately arched, apex rounded, termen straight, oblique; grey, faintly greenish tinged; a black basal area on costa reaching half across wing and indicated below middle by a few raised black scales; 5 or 6 black spots on costa between 1/3 and apex; an oblique black bar of raised scales beneath 1st costal spot, outwardly margined with ochreous and white; 3 or 4 ring-like spots and some scattered blackish and ochreous scales in disc; an obscure interrupted blackish subterminal fascia; termen thickly sprinkled with blackish scales: fringes fuscous-grey sprinkled with white. Hindwings shining grey, in ♂ with ochreous area along costa from base to 1/2 fringes ochreous-white.

== Distribution ==
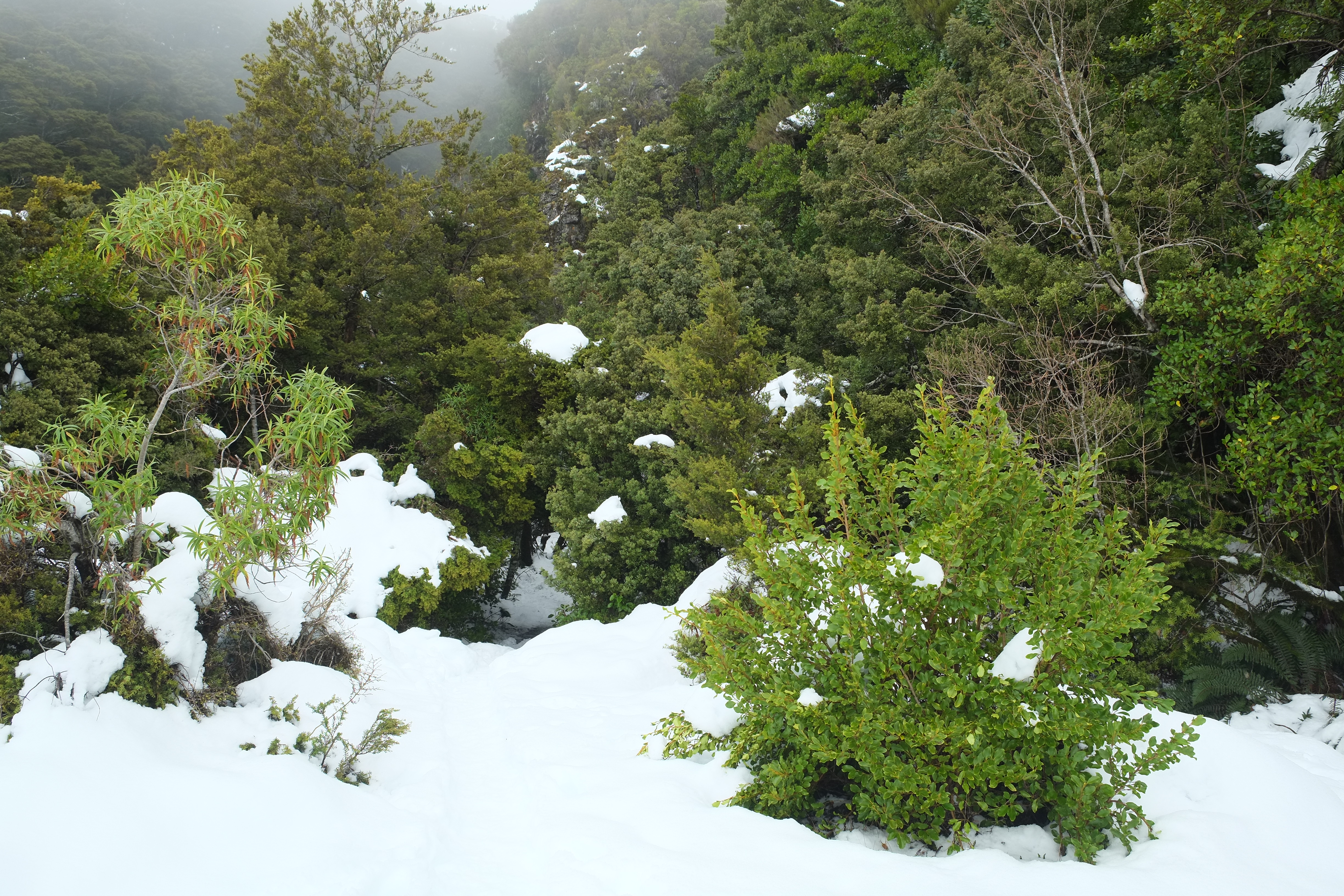
Governors Bush, the type locality of H. canescens.

This species is endemic to New Zealand. Other than the type locality, this species has been found in the Southern Alps at the junction of the Bealey and Waimakariri Rivers.

== Biology and behaviour ==
The adult moths of this species are on the wing in November and January to March.

== Host species ==
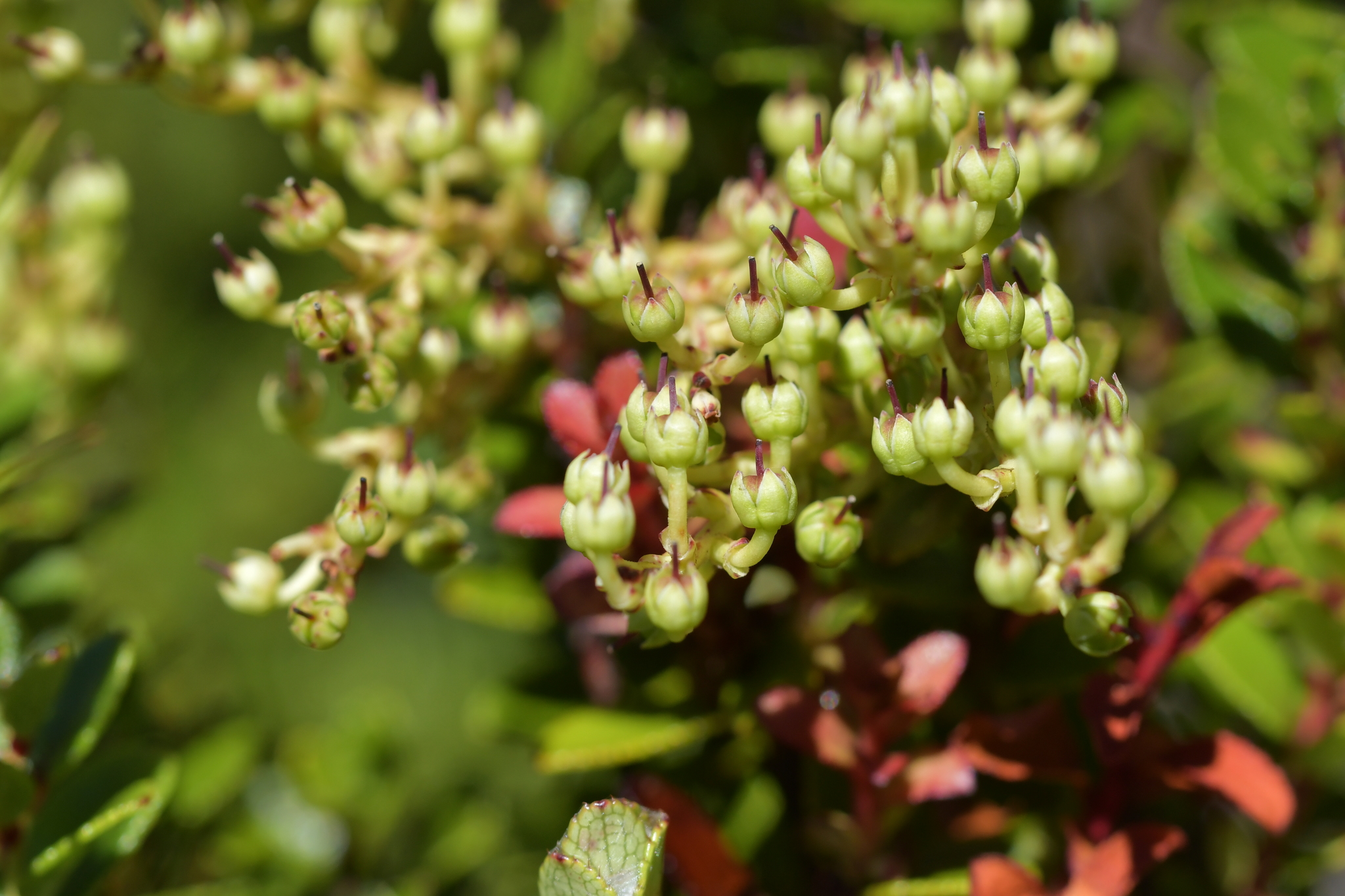
Flowers of Gaultheria crassa, a likely host plant of the larvae of H. canescens.

The larvae of this species feed on the fruits and flowers of Gaultheria species.
