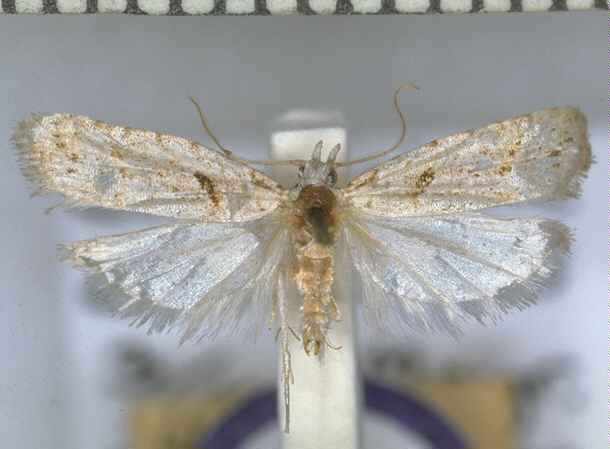
- Heterocrossa adreptella (previously known as H. charaxias)

Scientific classification
- Kingdom: Animalia
- Phylum: Arthropoda
- Clade: Pancrustacea
- Class: Insecta
- Order: Lepidoptera
- Family: Carposinidae
- Genus: Heterocrossa
- Species: H. adreptella

Binomial name
- Heterocrossa adreptella (Walker, 1864)

Synonyms
- Gelechia adreptella Walker, 1864; Carposina adreptella (Walker, 1864); Paramorpha adreptella (Walker, 1864); Heterocrossa charaxias Meyrick, 1891; Lysiphragma adreptella (Walker, 1864)

= Heterocrossa adreptella =

Species of moth

Heterocrossa adreptella is a moth of the Carposinidae family. This species was long considered the New Zealand raspberry budmoth however this was a taxonomic misinterpretation of the type material used to describe this species. This error was corrected in 1988 with the New Zealand raspberry budmoth giving its own species name Heterocrossa rubophaga. H. adreptella is endemic to New Zealand and has been collected in the Wellington Botanic Garden and been observed resting on mānuka branches.

== Taxonomy ==
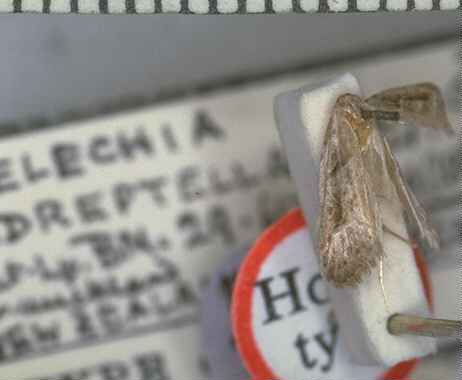
Male holotype of H. adreptella.

This species was first described by Francis Walker in 1864 and originally named Gelechia adreptella. Walker used specimens collected by D. Bolton in Auckland. In papers published in 1882 and 1883, Edward Meyrick misinterpreted Walker's type material and as a result Heterorcrossa adreptella was long considered the New Zealand raspberry budmoth. The New Zealand raspberry moth is in fact a different species from H. adreptella and is now known as Heterocrossa rubophaga. This error was corrected by John S. Dugdale in 1988. Dugdale, in the same publication, also synonymised Heterocrossa charaxias with H. adreptella. In 1928 George Hudson discussed and illustrated this species in his book The butterflies and moths of New Zealand under the name Carposina charaxias. Also in 1928 Alfred Philpott discussed and illustrated the male genitalia of H. charaxias. These illustrations, in the opinion of Dugdale, were in agreement with the genitalia slide of the holotype specimen of H. adreptella. The male holotype specimen is held at the Natural History Museum, London.

== Description ==
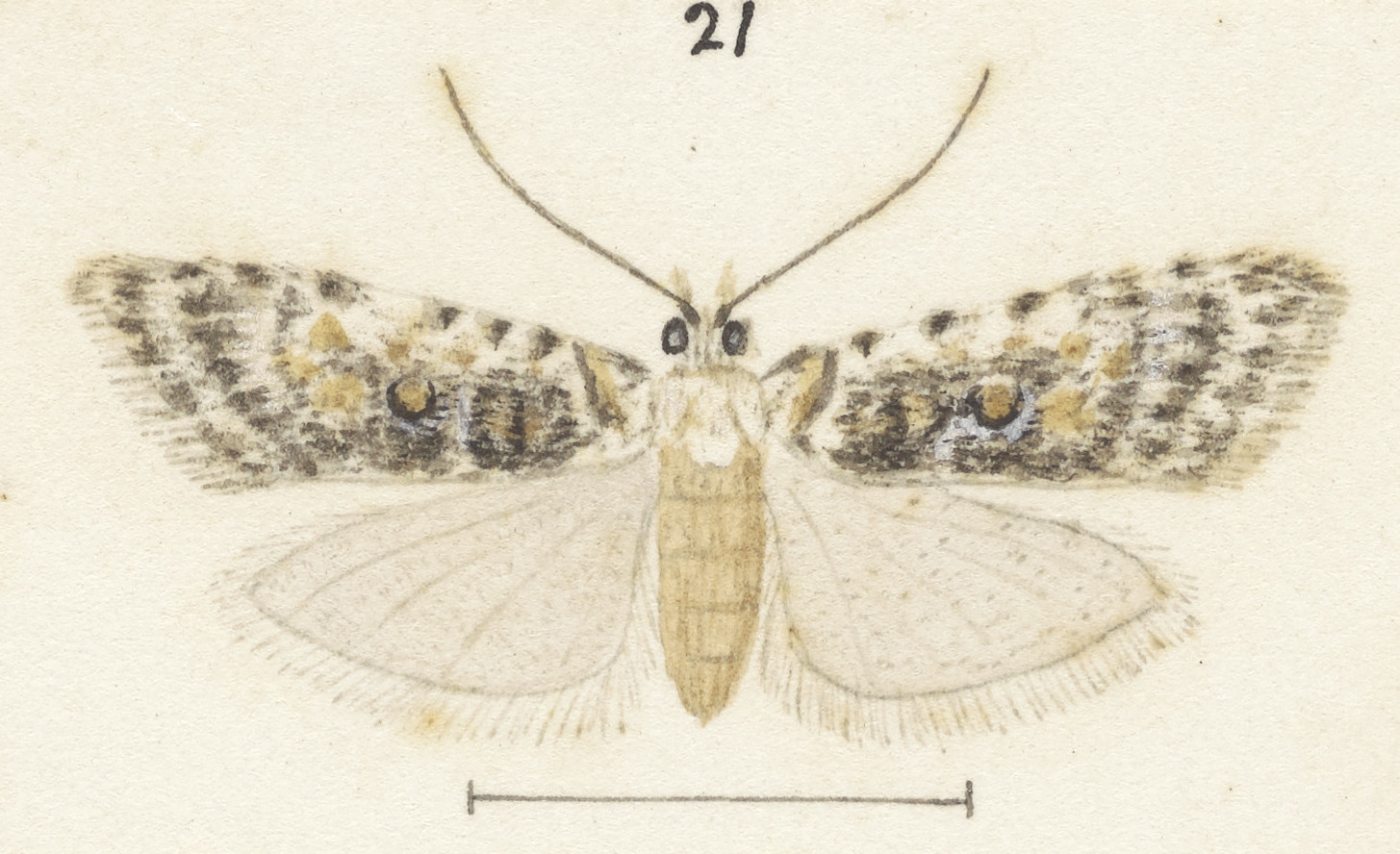
Illustration by George Hudson.

Hudson described the larva of this species as follows:

Length when fully extended about 3/4 inch (18 mm.). Elongate, cylindrical, slightly tapering at each end. Head rather small, square in front, with prominent antennae. Segment 2 with somewhat heart-shaped dorsal plate, a double excavation in margin next head, and semi-transparent sides and posterior margin. Segment 3 transverse. Remaining segments slightly stouter, a little tapering beyond middle. Segments 13 and 14 very much smaller. Head pale ochreous-brown, with darker brown lateral and central bands. Segments 2 and 3 darker brown on dorsal area. Remaining segments as far as segment 12, very pale ochreous-brown, with conspicuous claret-brown dorsal line and two brownish blotches on each side of this. Segment 13 with four conspicuous white dots on its dark brown posterior edge. Anal flap and prolegs semi-transparent. Tubercles small, yellowish and very inconspicuous, with short, very fine bristles. Surface of larva highly polished giving it a wet slimy look and somewhat suggesting general appearance of certain dipterous larvae.

Walker originally described the adult female of this species as follows:

Female. Cinereous. Head whitish cinereous. Abdomen extending much beyond the hind wings. Legs smooth, slender. Fore wings moderately broad, rounded at the tips, with several black speckles and points, and with a short black discal streak; exterior border straight, rather oblique. Length of the body 3 lines; of the wings 8 lines.

Hudson described the adult this species as follows:

The expansion of the wings is slightly over 1/2 inch. The fore-wings are rather elongate, oblong, with the termen very oblique and slightly waved, white densely speckled with brownish grey; a small black spot is situated on the costa near the base; a minute black dot on the dorsum near the base; seven small brown spots on the costa; a short oblique black bar in the disc before J, parallel to the termen; there are several scattered black dots or short marks preceding the tufts; an angulated series of sub-terminal dots obsolete at extremities and a series of very indistinct terminal dots. The hind-wings are white. The palpi are longer in the female than in the male.

This species can be distinguished from H. rubophaga as the hindwing anal area of adult specimens of H. adreptella have broad, yellowish scales present. There are also differences in the shape of the male genitalia of these species.

== Distribution ==
This species is endemic to New Zealand. It has been collected at the Wellington Botanic Garden, resting on mānuaka branches. It has also been collected in Otago.

== Behaviour and hosts. ==
The larvae are very active and feeds amongst the flowers of Rubus australis. Adults of this species are on the wing in November.
