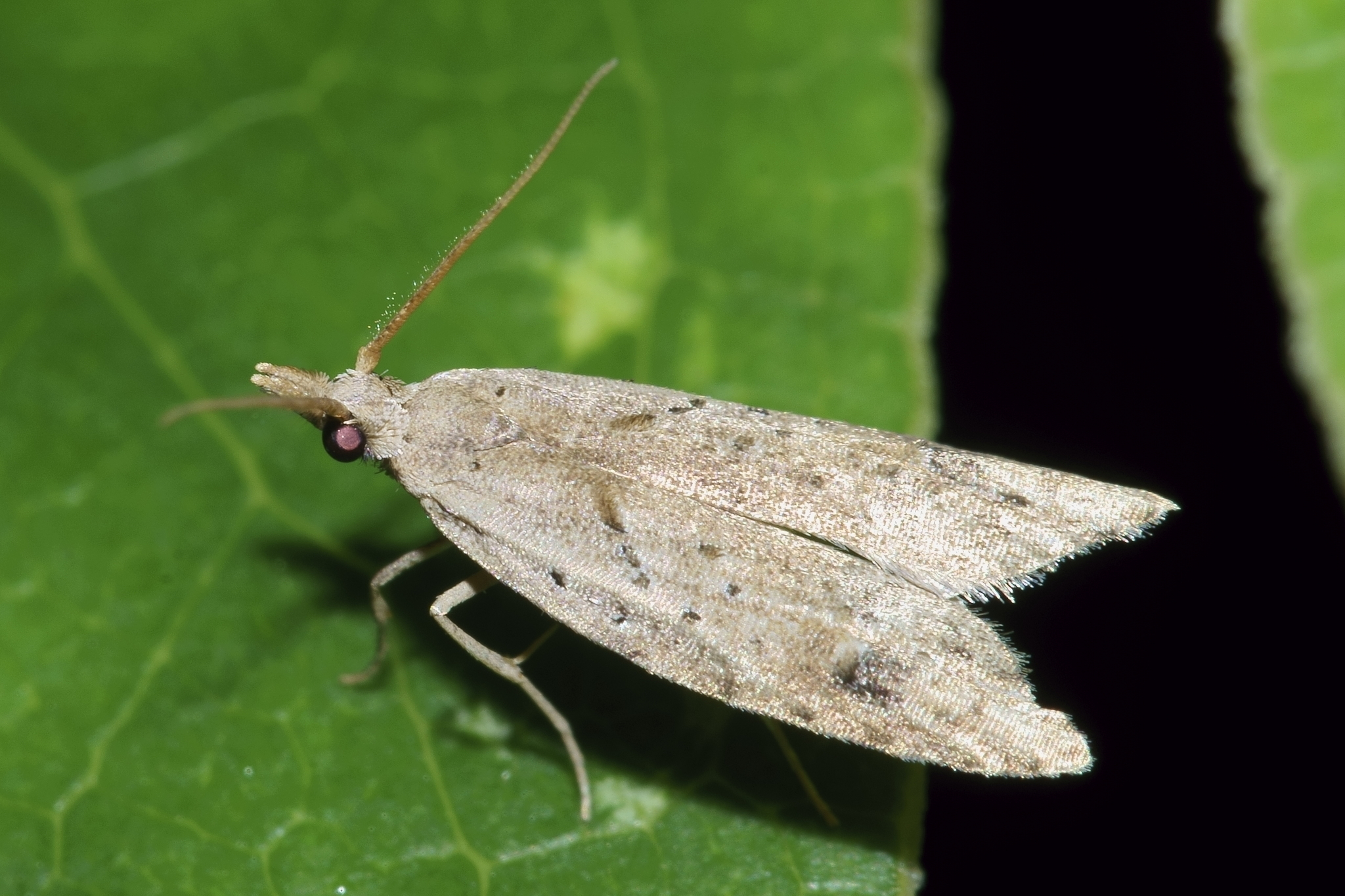

Scientific classification
- Kingdom: Animalia
- Phylum: Arthropoda
- Class: Insecta
- Order: Lepidoptera
- Family: Carposinidae
- Genus: Heterocrossa
- Species: H. rubophaga

Binomial name
- Heterocrossa rubophaga Dugdale, 1988

Synonyms
- Carposina rubophaga (Walker, 1864)

= Heterocrossa rubophaga =

Species of moth

The New Zealand raspberry bud moth (Heterocrossa rubophaga) is a moth of the Carposinidae family. It is endemic to New Zealand.

The larvae are destructive to the buds and fruit of raspberry and blackberry.
