= Elwood Zimmerman =

American entomologist (1912–2004)

Elwood Curtin Zimmerman
- Born: December 8, 1912; Spokane, Washington, U.S.
- Died: June 18, 2004 (aged 91); Tura Beach, New South Wales, Australia

Elwood Curtin Zimmerman AM (December 8, 1912 – June 18, 2004) was an American entomologist known for his two multivolume series: Insects of Hawaii published by the University of Hawaiʻi Press and Australian Weevils (Coleoptera: Curculionoidea) published by Australia's CSIRO.

== Biography ==
During his school years in the hills above Oakland, California, where his father was a woodworker, he developed such a passion for entomology that he acquired the nickname "Bugs." He would go on summer camping trips organized by the Boy Scout leader "Bugsy" Cain, and developed a circle of boyhood friends who went on to become entomologists, including Robert L. Usinger, Judson Linsley Gressitt, and E. Gorton Linsley. At first he collected butterflies, but began to concentrate on weevils at the suggestion of a professor at the nearby University of California, Berkeley. During a camping trip in 1930, he discovered a new species of weevil that became the subject of his first academic publication, in 1932, soon after enrolling in UC Berkeley, where he received a B.S. degree in 1936.

Based on his field experience and earlier work preparing Hawaiian and Pacific insect specimens for the Pacific Entomological Survey at UC Berkeley, Zimmerman was recommended by his mentors to serve as field entomologist on the Bernice P. Bishop Museum's Mangarevan Expedition to southeastern Polynesia in 1934. During the expedition, colleagues gave him the nickname "Zimmie", and his work in island ecosystems contributed to her later interest in biogeography.

Zimmerman settled in Honolulu in 1936, where he worked as an entomologist for the Bishop Museum and conceived the idea for a single-author, multivolume Insects of Hawaii monograph modeled on the Insects of Western North America (1926) by his Berkeley mentor, Edward Oliver Essig. By 1946, he had completed the first five volumes, but Bishop Museum director Peter H. Buck was more eager to publish new works in anthropology than in entomology, so Zimmerman turned instead to the University of Hawaiʻi, whose president, Gregg M. Sinclair, agreed to publish the volumes under the auspices of the newly established University of Hawaiʻi Press. The first five volumes finally appeared—to considerable local and international acclaim—in 1948, the same year that their author received a Fulbright fellowship to work at the British Natural History Museum on its large holdings of Hawaiian insects, many of them collected by R. C. L. Perkins over a period of 25 years beginning in the 1890s, at a time when many native fauna were disappearing.

Zimmerman spent most of the next two decades living on grant money and private funds in London as an honorary associate of the British Museum and residing in Peterborough, New Hampshire, which provided proximity to the Museum of Comparative Zoology at Harvard University. He completed a Ph.D. from the University of London in 1956, published three more volumes of Insects of Hawaii in 1957–58, and prepared one more that remained unpublished until 1978. He was also made a life-fellow of the American Association for the Advancement of Science in 1957.

Meanwhile, back in Honolulu, D. Elmo Hardy and others began publishing further volumes of Insects of Hawaii devoted to the exceptionally rich variety of Diptera (true flies) in the islands, a variety Zimmerman had called attention to in a short contribution to Evolution in 1958 with the provocative title, "300 insect species of Drosophila in Hawaii?—A challenge to geneticists and evolutionists" (Evolution 12, pp. 557–558).

This paper helped stimulate one of the most outstanding and scientifically rewarding long-term, multidisciplinary research efforts in the history of evolutionary biology, encompassing systematics, genetics, ecology, and ethology of the Drosophila complex.

By the 1970s, however, Zimmerman had trouble securing the funds needed to keep working on Insects of Hawaii and ended up accepting a generous offer from Douglas Waterhouse at Australia's CSIRO to turn his attention to producing another ambitious multivolume monograph, this time on Australian Weevils. By 1990, he had the first five volumes ready to publish, only to find that funding for this project, too, had dried up. He and his wife sold much of their estate, not just to subsidize publication, but also to endow an ongoing position at CSIRO for research on Pacific weevils. In 1992, they moved from their cattle station near Canberra to a home and laboratory on Tura Beach, where Zimmerman spent his remaining years.

Among the awards Zimmerman received for his life's work were a fellowship to the Entomological Society of America in 1946;v a D.Sc. from the University of London in 1980; the Karl Jordan Medal for his work on Hawaiian Lepidoptera in 1983; the Herbert E. Gregory Medal at the Pacific Science Congress in Beijing in 1995; and Member of the Order of Australia and the University of Hawaiʻi Regents' Medal of Distinction in 1998.

== Insects of Hawaii ==
The Insects of Hawaii series, now under the editorship of James K. Liebherr of Cornell University, aims to provide a collaborative, comprehensive, taxonomy of all known Hawaiian insect fauna. So far, more than 5,000 native arthropod species have been described. Only vols. 1, 16, and 17 are still in print, but the out-of-print volumes are being scanned and added to the University of Hawaii's digital repository, ScholarSpace.

- 1. Reissue of the Introduction. Elwood C. Zimmerman, with new Foreword by James K. Liebherr and short biography of the author by James O. Juvik. (2001) - Geological History of Hawaii: Derivation, Dispersal, and Distribution. Evolution and Development, Analyses and Summaries of Biota
- 16. Hawaiian Carabidae (Coleoptera). James K. Liebherr and Elwood C. Zimmerman. (2000) - Part 1: Introduction and Tribe Platynini
- 17. Hawaiian Hylaeus (Nesoprosopis) Bees. Howell V. Daly and Karl N. Magnacca. (2003) - Hymenoptera: Apoidea

The out-of-print volumes follow:

- 1. Introduction. Elwood C. Zimmerman. (1947) - Geological History of Hawaii: Derivation, Dispersal, and Distribution. Evolution and Development, Analyses and Summaries of Biota
- 2. Apterygota to Thysanoptera. Elwood C. Zimmerman. (1948) - Thysanura, Diplura, Protura, Collembola, Orthoptea, Isoptera, Embioptera, Dermaptera, Zoraptera, Corrondentia, Mallophaga, Anoplura, Odonata, Thysanoptera
- 3. Heteroptera. Elwood C. Zimmerman. (1948) - Cydnidae, Pentatomidae, Coreidae, Lygaeidea, Tingidae, Enicocephalidae, Reduviidea, Nabidae, Cimicidae, Anthocoridae, Cryptostemmatidae, Miridae, Saldidae, Hebridae, Mesoveliidae, Veliidae, Gerridae, Notonectidae, Corixidae
- 4. Homoptera: Auchenorhyncha. Elwood C. Zimmerman. (1948) - Cercopidae, Cicadellidae, Membracidae, Cixiidae, Delphacidae, Flatidae
- 5. Homoptera: Sternorhyncha. Elwood C. Zimmerman. (1948) - Psylloidea, Aleyrodoidea, Aphidoidea, Coccoidea
- 6. Ephemeroptera-Neuroptera-Trichoptera and Supplement to Volumes 1-5. Elwood C. Zimmerman. (1957, out of print)
- 7. Macrolepidoptera. Elwood C. Zimmerman. (1958) - Geometridae, Noctuidae, Sphingidae, Pieridae, Nymphalidae, Danaidae, Lycaenidae
- 8. Lepidoptera: Pyraloidea. Elwood C. Zimmerman. (1958) - Galleriinae, Pyraustinae, Scopariinae, Nymphulinae, Pyralinae, Crambinae, Phycitinae, Pterophoridae, Alucitidae
- 9. Microlepidoptera. Elwood C. Zimmerman. (1978) - Monotrysia, Tineoidea, Tortricoidea, Gracillarioidea, Yponomeutoidea, Alucitoidea, Gelechioidea
- 10. Diptera: Nematocera-Brachycera (except Dolichopodidae). D. Elmo Hardy. (1960) - Tipulidae, Psychodidae, Culicidae, Chironomidae, Ceratopogonidae, Scatopsidae, Mycetophilidae, Sciaridae, Cecidomyiidae, Stratiomyidae, Bombyliidae, Scenopinidae, Empididae
- 11. Diptera: Brachycera II-Cyclorrhapha. I. D. Elmo Hardy. (1964) - Dolichopodidae, Phoridae, Lonchopteridae, Pipunculidae, Syrphidae
- 11, Supplement. Diptera: Dolichopodidae and Appendix (Phoridae). JoAnn M. Tenorio. (1969)
- 12. Diptera: Cyclorrhapha II. D. Elmo Hardy. (1965) - Series Schizophora, Section Acalypterae I, Family Drosophilidae
- 13. Diptera: Cyclorrhapha III. D. Elmo Hardy and M. D. Delfinado. (1980) - Series Schizophora, Section Acalypterae, Exclusive of Family Drosophilidae
- 14. Diptera: Cyclorrhapha IV. D. Elmo Hardy. (1981) - Series Schizophora, Section Calyptratae
- 15. Collembola. Kenneth Christiansen and Peter Bellinger. (1992) - Suborder Arthropleona; Suborder Symphypleona

== Australian Weevils ==
Australian Weevils (Coleoptera: Curculionoidea) is an 8-volume, comprehensive monograph that includes all the recorded species, with notes about their distributions, economic importance, host plants, and life histories, amply illustrated with roughly 10,000 images, over half of them in color. The following volumes are still in print.

- 1 (1994). Anthribidae to Attelabidae: The Primitive Weevils - Anthribidae, Belidae, Nemonychidae, Caridae, Rhynchitidae, Attelabidae
- 2 (1994). Brentidae, Eurhynchidae, Apionidae and a Chapter on Immature Stages by Brenda May
- 3 (1993). Nanophyidae, Rhynchophoridae, Erirhinidae, Curculionidae: Amycterinae, Literature Consulted
- 5 (1992). Colour Plates 1-304 - (Orthoceri) from Anthribidae to Apionidae; Heteromorphi; Gonatoceri: Amycterinae and Entiminae (Adelognatha).
