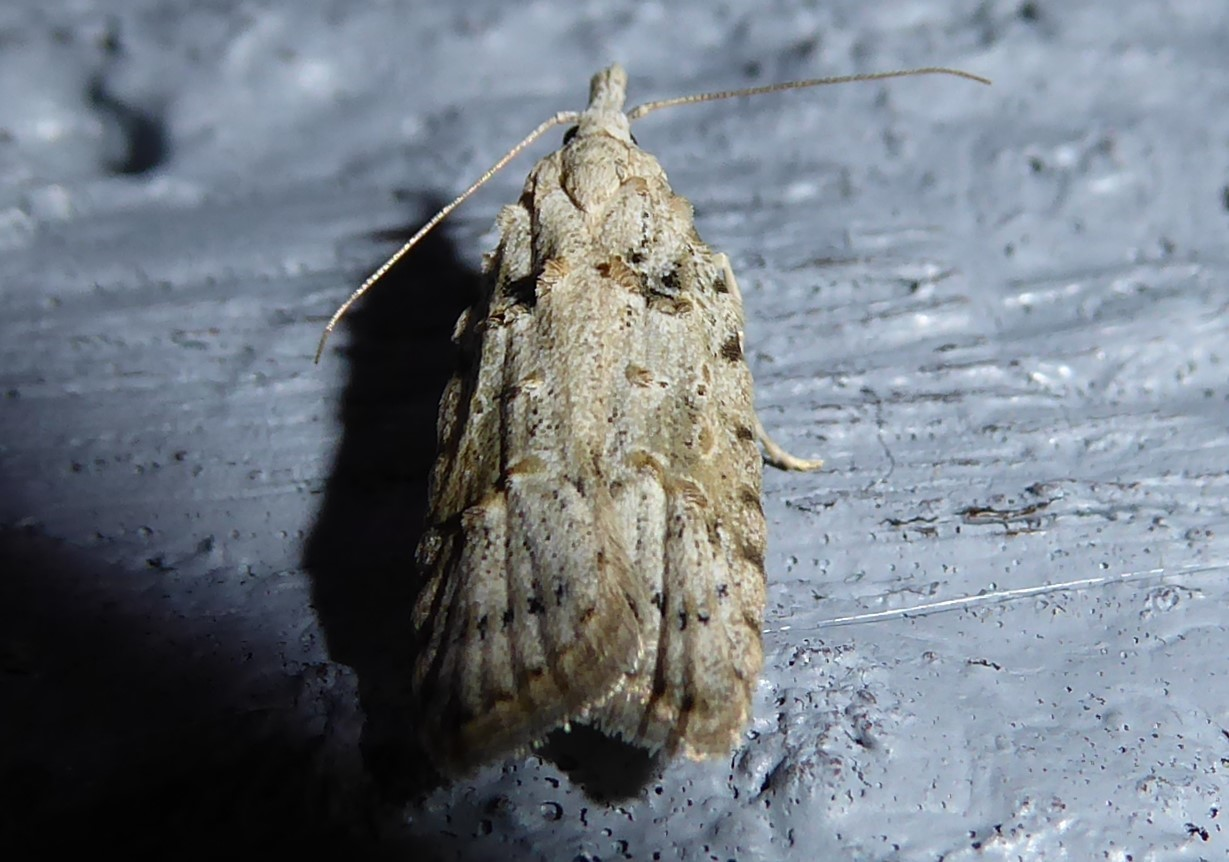

Scientific classification
- Kingdom: Animalia
- Phylum: Arthropoda
- Class: Insecta
- Order: Lepidoptera
- Family: Carposinidae
- Genus: Heterocrossa
- Species: H. gonosemana

Binomial name
- Heterocrossa gonosemana Meyrick, 1882

Synonyms
- Carposina gonosemana (Meyrick, 1882)

= Heterocrossa gonosemana =

Species of moth

Heterocrossa gonosemana is a species of moth in the family Carposinidae. It is endemic to New Zealand and is found throughout the country. It inhabits native forest. Larvae feed on seeds and fruit of Griselinia lucida and possibly Griselinia littoralis. They can be extremely active when disturbed. This species overwinters as a pupa, enclosed in a cocoon, underneath its host plant. Adults are on the wing from November until February and can be found during the day resting on lichen covered tree trunks where they are well camouflaged. The adult is nocturnal and is attracted to light.

== Taxonomy ==
H. gonosemana was first described by Edward Meyrick in 1882 using material he collected in Dunedin in February. In 1922 Meyrick classified Heterocrossa as a synonym of the genus Carposina. George Hudson, following Meyrick, discussed and illustrated this species under the name Carposina gonosemana in his 1928 publication The Butterflies and Moths of New Zealand. However John S. Dugdale doubted whether the illustration by Hudson of H. gonosemana was based on a specimen of that species. Also in 1928 Alfred Philpott examined the genitalia of male specimens of what were then known as C. gonoseana and C. epomiana and, as a result of that examination and after a discussion with Meyrick, resurrected C. epomiana as a distinct species. In 1978 Elwood Zimmerman argued that the genus Heterocrassa should not be a synonym of Carposina as the genitalia of the species within the genus Heterocrassa are distinctive. In 1988 Dugdale assigned this species back to the genus Heterocrossa. The male lectotype specimen is held at the Natural History Museum, London.

== Description ==
Hudson described the larva of H. gonosemana as follows:

The larva of this species, which feeds on the berries of Griselinia lucida, is about 1/3 inch (13 mm.) in length, extremely stout, cylindrical, tapering suddenly at each end. head small, bright ochreous-brown. Segment 2 also rather small, with conspicuous shining greenish-ochreous plate. General colour pale ochreous-green, more strongly tinged with green on anterior half; tubercles large, conspicuous, especially on thoracic segments, dull green and highly polished, a fine short bristle arising from each tubercle. Dorsal surface of larva dull reddish, more or less clouded with blackish anterior to segment 7. The whole surface of the larva is highly polished.

Hudson described the pupa as follows:

The pupa is enclosed in a very tough, oval cocoon, about 1/2 inch (12 mm.) in length, constructed of silk and very fine grains of earth.

The pupa is 8mm in length and is greenish-white in colour. Its abdominal segments are short while the leg and wing cases are unusually large. The cocoon in which the pupa is enclosed is oval in shape and approximately 12mm in length.

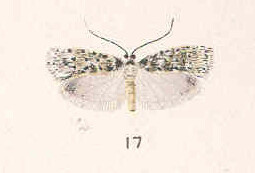
Illustration of specimen from Auckland Island.

Meyrick described the adult of this species as follows:

♀︎. 9". Head white. Palpi about twice the length of head, upper half white, lower half dark fuscous, terminal joint white, dark fuscous at base. Antennae white, with indications of dark rings. Thorax white, on shoulders ochreous-tinged. Abdomen ochreous-white. Anterior and middle legs dark fuscous, with ochreous-white rings at apex of joints; posterior legs ochreous-white. Forewings elongate-oblong, narrow, costa slightly arched, bent and roughened with scales about one-third, apex obtusely pointed, hindmargin straight, moderately oblique; white, with a few scattered grey scales, towards inner margin very faintly ochreous-tinged; a thick black streak along basal fifth of costa, attenuated at each end; a black dot on costa closely beyond it; a small irregular black mark in disc at one-third, immediately preceded by a small dark fuscous-grey suffusion, and followed by two tufts of raised scales, half blackish and half white; a small subquadrate rather inwardly oblique black spot on costa at one-third, almost connected with discal black spot; all these black markings are somewhat mixed on margins with ochreous; some raised scales towards base, and inner margin at one-third; five short cloudy blackish marks on costa at equal distances between one-third and apex, rather oblique inwardly; five small spots of raised whitish-ochreous scales arranged in an oval in disc, each with a few black scales on margin; between these, and above posterior of them, is an ill-defined grey suffusion; a very ill-defined cloudy grey irregular dentate transverse line from second of the five costal marks to inner margin at four-fifths, only distinct on upper half and on inner margin; a more distinct dentate grey line from third costal mark to inner margin before anal angle, strongly curved outwards and sinuate, containing a series of ill-defined black dots; a row of very ill-defined black dots on hindmargin : cilia grey, closely irrorated with whitish points. Hindwings whitish- slaty-grey, cilia white, with a faint grey line.

Adults are visually very similar to H. epomiana and to H. philpotti. Adults moths of H. gonosemana are variable in appearance and tend to be of a darker shade in the more southern parts of New Zealand in comparison to the northern localities.

== Distribution ==
H. gonosemana is endemic to New Zealand. It is found throughout the country and has been collected at locations such as Wellington, Nelson, Ōtira River, Dunedin, Lake Wakatipu, Invercargill, Stewart Island, and Auckland Island.

== Biology and behaviour ==
The larva is very active when it is disturbed. This species spends the winter as a pupa. The pupa is enclosed in a cocoon that can be found in the soil beneath the larvae host. The adult moth emerges in December when bred in captivity. In the wild, adults of H. gonosemana are on the wing from November until February. They can be found during the day resting on tree trucks where they blend well with lichen patches. The adult moth is nocturnal and attracted to light.

== Habitat and host species ==
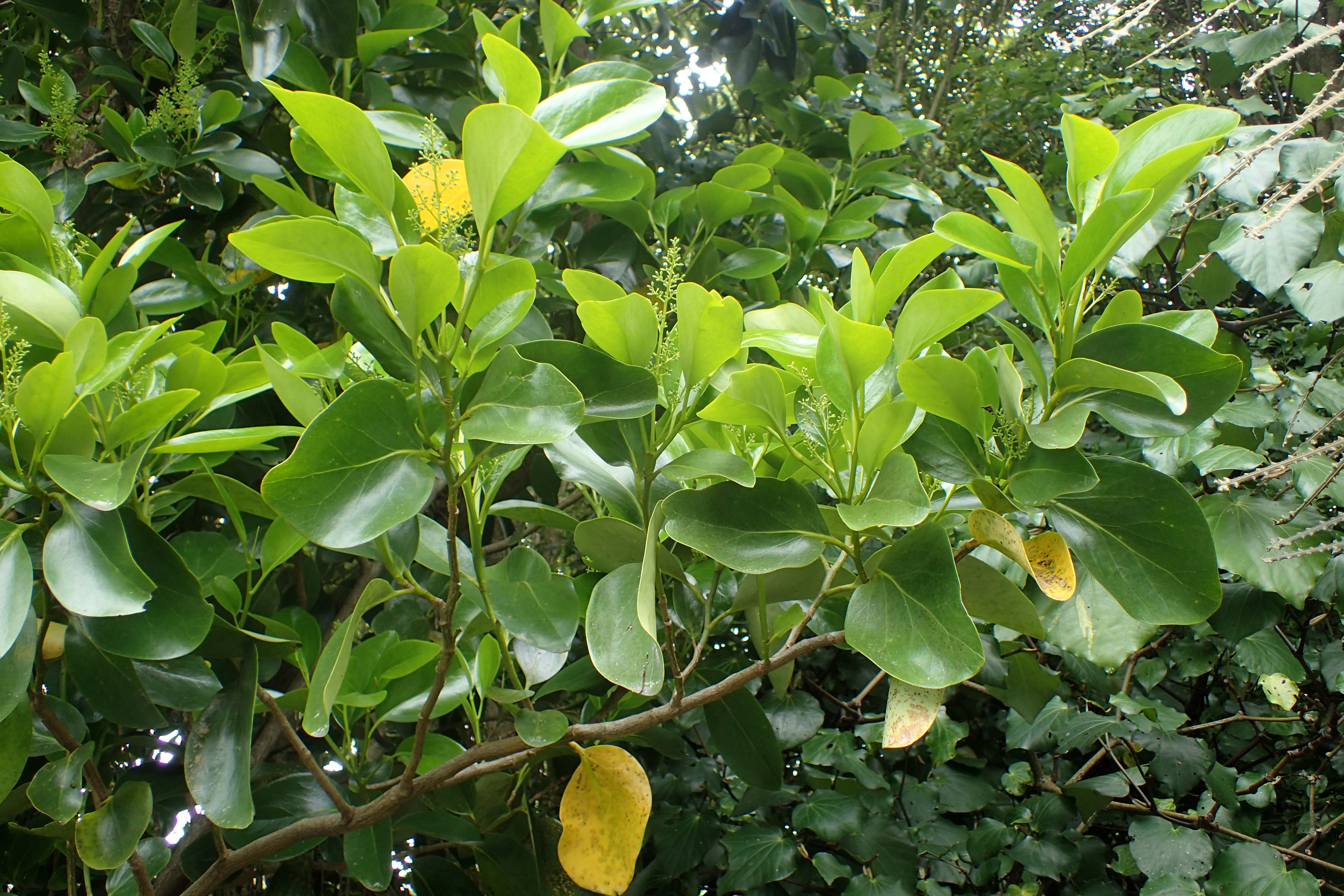
Larval host Griselinia lucida

This species inhabits native forest. The larvae have been recorded feeding on seeds and fruit of Griselinia lucida. It is possible the larvae also feed on the fruit of Griselinia littoralis.
