= Griselinia lucida =

- Foliage of Griselinia lucida

Conservation status
- Not Threatened (NZ TCS)

Scientific classification
- Kingdom: Plantae
- Clade: Tracheophytes
- Clade: Angiosperms
- Clade: Eudicots
- Clade: Asterids
- Order: Apiales
- Family: Griseliniaceae
- Genus: Griselinia
- Species: G. lucida

Binomial name
- Griselinia lucida (J.R.Forst. et G.Forst.) G.Forst.

Species of flowering plant

Griselinia lucida, commonly known as puka, akapuka, and shining broadleaf, is a species of shrub in the family Griseliniaceae. It is endemic to New Zealand. Its range mainly covers the North and South Islands. It typically grows epiphytically, meaning it grows on other plants, although it can also be found in coastal and rocky environments. It reaches 10 metres (30 feet) in maximum height. The leaves are large, thick, and glossy, and the roots are grooved and often grow downward until they reach the forest floor.

Griselinia lucida was first described by the German botanist Georg Forster in 1786. It is only one of two Griselinia species found in New Zealand. Pollination is likely achieved by insects or the wind. The fruits are dispersed by fruit-eating animals (frugivores), such as birds. Germination requires light and moist conditions. Its 2023 conservation status in the New Zealand Threat Classification System is "Not Threatened".

== Description ==
Roots of G. lucida around a stout pukatea (Laurelia novae-zelandiae) trunk

Griselinia lucida is a species of evergreen shrub or small tree in the family Griseliniaceae. It reaches 8 metres (26 feet) in height, and it commonly occurs as an epiphyte (growing on another plant). The crown can reach a width of 8 m (26 ft) or more in a canopy. G. lucida can also be considered as a hemiepiphyte because of its large, brown to grey-coloured grooved roots, which often grow downward to reach the forest floor.

Leaves are thick, glabrous, glossy, and leathery in texture. They are found in an alternating pattern and are broadly ovate to oblong in character, with a rounded tip. Leaves are 7–18 cm (2.8–7.1 in) long, 5–9 cm (2.0–3.5 in) wide, and 0.3–0.7 mm thick. Very young leaves can have a reddish-purple coloured margin. The undersides of the leaves can be whitish in colour. The petioles are 2.5–5 cm (0.98–1.97 in) long.

The inflorescences (flower clusters) are found on peduncles, which are 10–15 cm (3.9–5.9 in) long. The peduncle can have trichomes at the top. The inflorescences are found at the ends of branchlets. Flowers are small, only about 1–3 mm long, and they are a cream or yellowish colour. Fruiting occurs in infructescences (fruit clusters) with small, oval, berry-like, fruits that are 4–10 mm long and 5 mm in diameter. They are dark purple when they are ripened. Each fruit contains a single seed, which is about 4 mm long and 3 mm wide. G. lucida has a diploid chromosome count of 36.

== Taxonomy ==
Griselinia lucida was first described by the German botanist Georg Forster in 1786. There are only two New Zealand members of the genus, G. lucida and G. littoralis. The taxonomic placement of this genus was previously uncertain, and has been formerly placed in the families Araliaceae, Cornaceae, and Juglandaceae. A 1980 study then moved the genus to Griseliniaceae. Griselinia is suggested to have emerged in the Miocene.

=== Etymology ===
Griselinia lucida's genus name, Griselinia, is named is honour of the Italian botanist Francesco Griselini. The specific epithet (second part of the scientific name), lucida, means 'shining'. The species is commonly known as puka, akapuka and shining broadleaf. Other Māori names for the plant include akakōpuka and pukatea. The name puka is also used to describe the unrelated Meryta sinclairii.

== Ecology ==
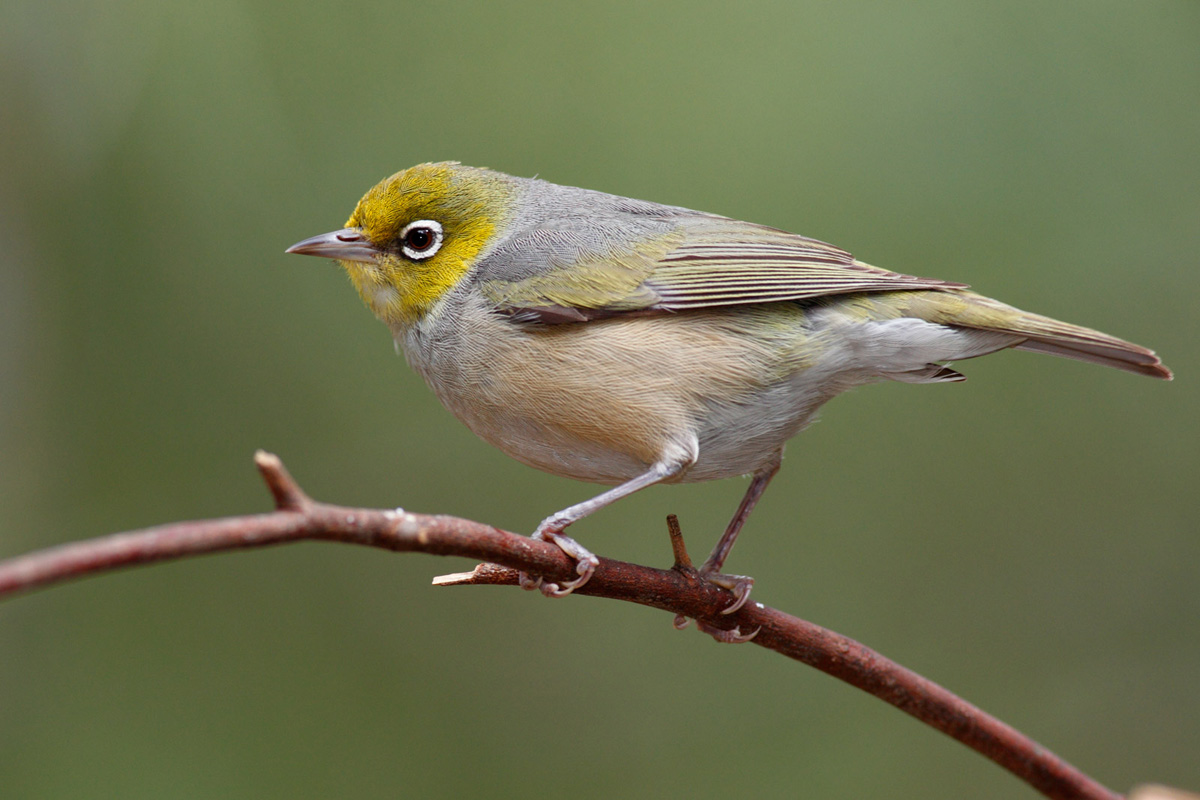
The native silvereye bird consumes the fruits of G. lucida.

Griselinia lucida's seeds are dispersed by fruit-eating animals (frugivores), such as birds. G. lucida's fruits are dispersed by bird species, which includes, but is not limited to: kererū (Hemiphaga novaeseelandiae), New Zealand bellbirds (Anthornis melanura), silvereyes (Zosterops lateralis), and tūī (Prosthemadera novaeseelandiae). The North Island kōkako (Callaeas wilsoni) browse the leaves and buds of the plant, and may also consume the fruits. Pollination is likely achieved by insects or the wind. Bees occasionally visit the flowers to collect nectar. Germination of the seed requires light and moist conditions.

Griselinia lucida plays host to numerous insects, including: Aenetus virescens, Glaucias amyoti, Heterocrossa gonosemana, Phyllonorycter messaniella, and Oemona hirta. Deer and goats possibly eat parts of the tree, but this has not been confirmed in published studies.

== Distribution ==
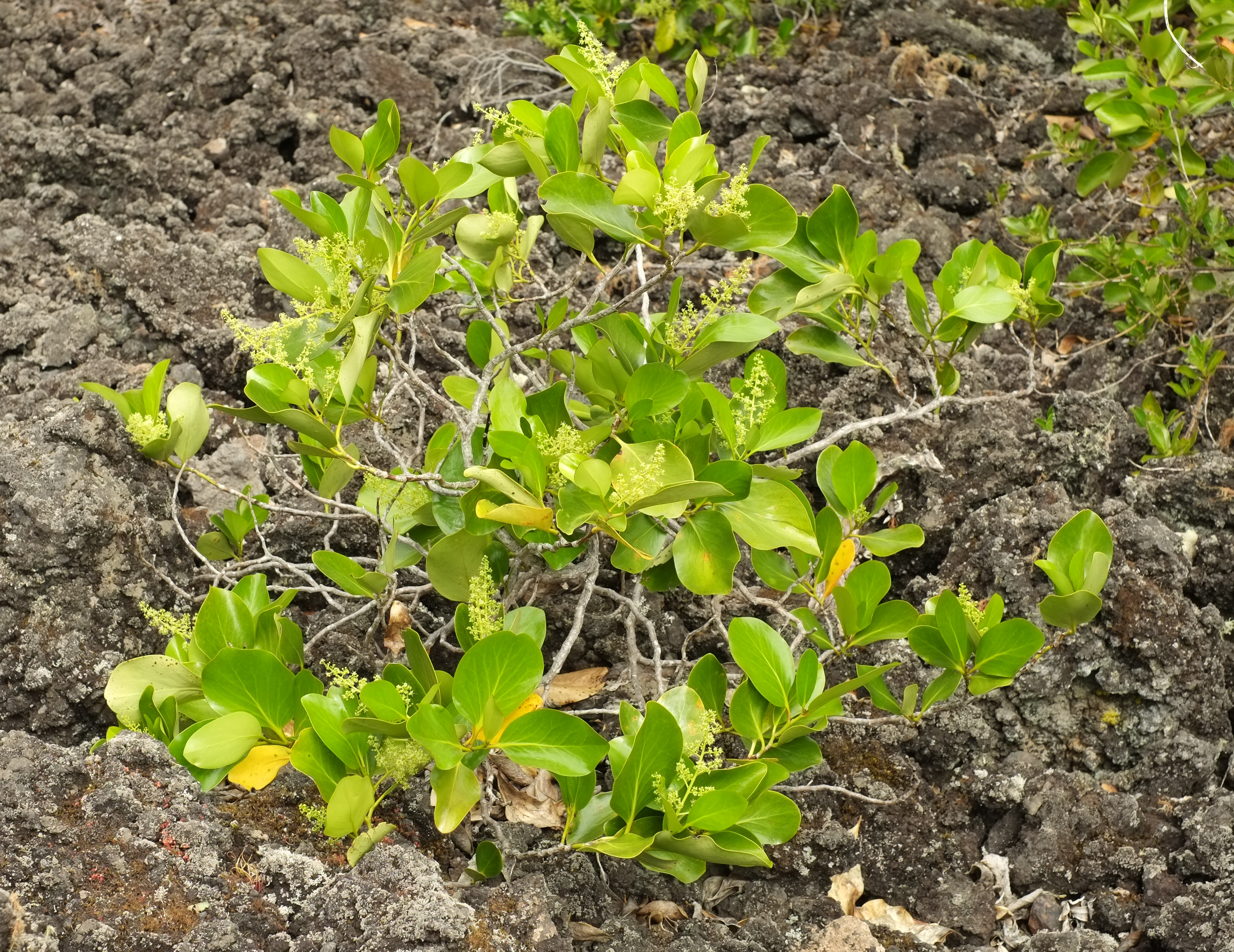
Griselinia lucida growing in a rocky environment on Rangitoto Island

Griselinia lucida is endemic to New Zealand. Its range mainly covers the North, and South Islands, but the species is most common in the North Island. G. lucida is primarily found on the west coast of New Zealand, with a relatively small presence on the east coasts of both islands. In the North Island, G. lucida is able to extend further inland than the South Island due to there being less mountainous terrain and warmer climates. The species' southern limit is confirmed to be at least Milford Sound in Fiordland. Records further south of Milford Sound are uncertain, as they are not backed by herbarium specimens. G. lucida's 2023 conservation status in the New Zealand Threat Classification System is "Not Threatened".

=== Habitat ===
Griselinia lucida can establish itself in different environments. G. lucida primarily grows as a light-demanding epiphyte in the canopy of old-growth forests, but it also occurs on coastal cliffs and rocky sites. In the North Island's Taranaki and Waikato regions, G. lucida is most common in epiphytic relationships with pukatea (Laurelia novae-zelandiae) and tawa (Beilschmiedia tawa). Near the South Island coastal town of Kaikōura, G. lucida is commonly associated with kiekie (Freycinetia banksii), nīkau (Rhopalostylis sapida), among other plants.

== Uses ==
The indigenous Māori people had few uses of G. lucida, but they did use the wood in the making of cartridge holders. In traditional medicinal practices, the inner bark is said to have soothing characteristics for skin conditions. The inner bark is similar to that found on G. littoralis. European settlers used the wood in constructing fence-posts and in work by millwrights.

== Works cited ==
Books

- Crowe, Andrew (2009). Which Native Forest Plant?. Auckland, New Zealand: Penguin Books. ISBN 978-0-14-300901-6.
- Dillon, M. O. (2018). "Griseliniaceae: Griseliniaceae Takh., Sist. Magnol. 209 (1987).". Flowering Plants. Eudicots. Cham: Springer International Publishing. doi:10.1007/978-3-319-93605-5_7. ISBN 978-3-319-93604-8.
- Gledhill, David (2002). The Names of Plants. Cambridge, United Kingdom: Cambridge University Press. ISBN 978-0-521-68553-5.
- Kirk, Thomas (1889). The Forest Flora of New Zealand. Wellington, New Zealand: Government of New Zealand.
- Moore, Lucy B. (1978). The Oxford Book of New Zealand Plants. Oxford University Press. ISBN 978-0-19-558035-8.
- Wardle, J. (2011). Wardle's Native Plants of New Zealand and Their Story. Bateson Publishing Limited. ISBN 9781877520068.

Journals

- Bryan, Catherine L; Clarkson, Bruce D; Clearwater, Michael J (2011). "Biological Flora of New Zealand 12: Griselinia lucida, Puka, Akapuka, Akakōpuka, Shining Broadleaf". New Zealand Journal of Botany. 49 (4): 461–479. doi:10.1080/0028825X.2011.603342. ISSN 0028-825X.
- Burrows, C. J. (1999). "Germination Behaviour of Seeds of the New Zealand Woody Species Beilschmiedia tawa, Dysoxylum spectabile, Griselinia lucida, and Weinmannia racemosa". New Zealand Journal of Botany. 37 (1): 95–105. doi:10.1080/0028825X.1999.9512616. ISSN 0028-825X.
- Butz Huryn, Vivian M. (1995). "Use of native New Zealand plants by honey bees (Apis mellifera L.): A review". New Zealand Journal of Botany. 33 (4): 497–512. doi:10.1080/0028825X.1995.10410621. ISSN 0028-825X.
- Dillon, Michael O.; Munoz-Schick, Melica (1993). "A Revision of the Dioecious Genus Griselinia (Griseliniaceae), Including a New Species from the Coastal Atacama Desert of Northern Chile". Brittonia. 45 (4): 261. doi:10.2307/2807602.
- Mildenhall, D.C. (1980). "New Zealand late Cretaceous and cenozoic plant biogeography: A contribution". Palaeogeography, Palaeoclimatology, Palaeoecology. 31. Elsevier BV: 197–233. doi:10.1016/0031-0182(80)90019-x. ISSN 0031-0182.
- Sopow, Stephanie L.; Bain, John (2017). "A checklist of New Zealand Cerambycidae (Insecta: Coleoptera), excluding Lamiinae". New Zealand Entomologist. 40 (2): 55–71. Bibcode:2017NZEnt..40...55S. doi:10.1080/00779962.2017.1357423. ISSN 0077-9962.

Websites

- De Lange, Peter (2026). "Griselinia lucida". New Zealand Plant Conservation Network. Archived from the original on 20 April 2025.
- "Griselinia lucida (J.R.Forst. & G.Forst.) G.Forst., Fl. Ins. Austr. 75 (1786)". The Royal Botanic Gardens, Kew, Harvard University Herbaria & Libraries and Australian National Herbarium. International Plant Names Index. 2026. Archived from the original on 25 December 2024.
