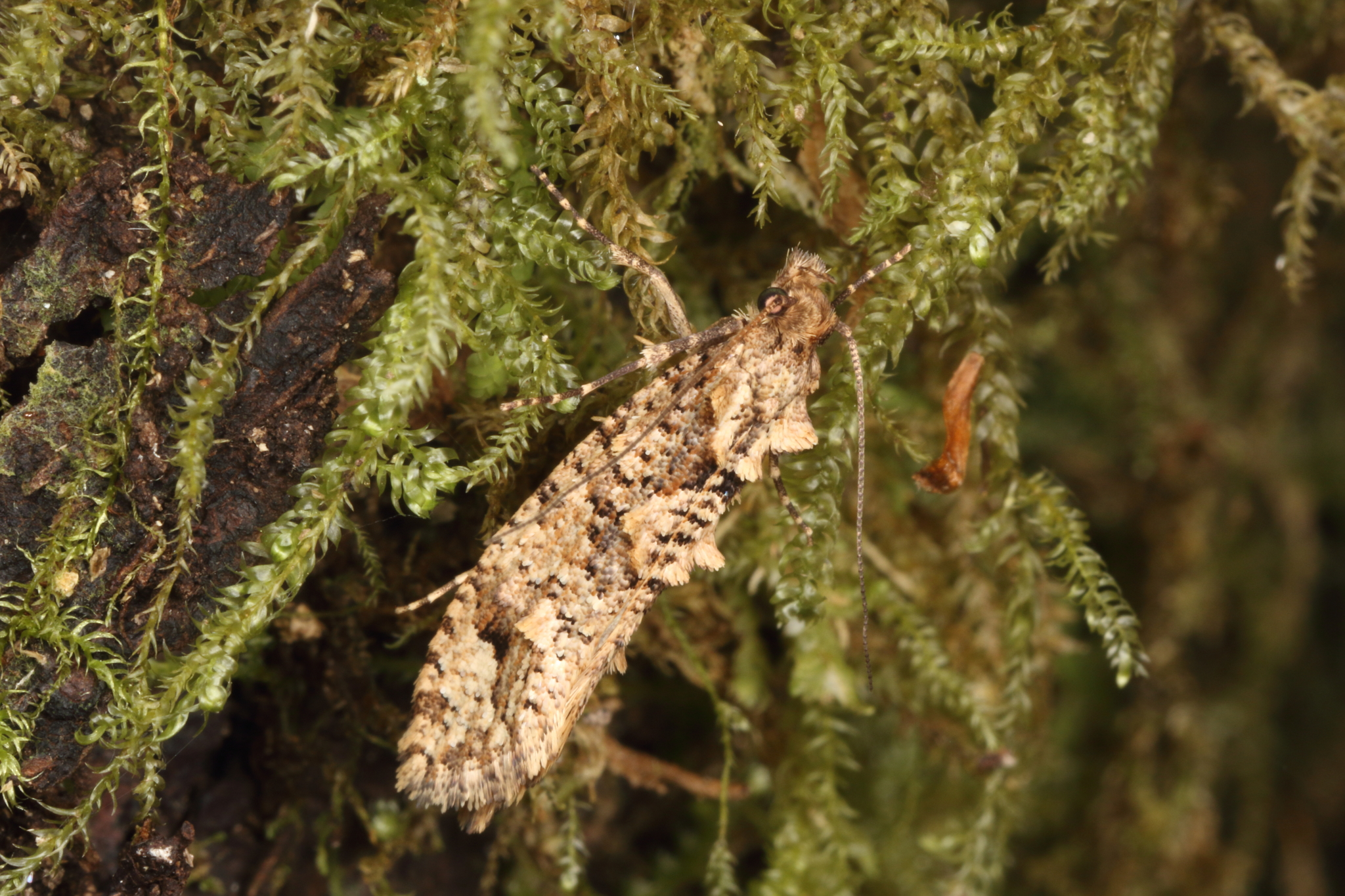

Scientific classification
- Kingdom: Animalia
- Phylum: Arthropoda
- Clade: Pancrustacea
- Class: Insecta
- Order: Lepidoptera
- Family: Tineidae
- Genus: Lysiphragma
- Species: L. epixyla

Binomial name
- Lysiphragma epixyla Meyrick, 1888

= Lysiphragma epixyla =

Species of moth

Lysiphragma epixyla is a species of moth in the family Tineidae. This species was first described by Edward Meyrick in 1888. It is endemic to New Zealand and has been observed in the North and South Islands. It inhabits dense native forest. The larvae feed under the bark of dead pukatea, tree fuchsias, kapuka, hinau and beech trees in the genus Nothofagus. Adults are commonly on the wing from November until January. Adults can commonly be found resting on trunks of trees.

== Taxonomy ==
This species was first described by Edward Meyrick in 1888 using specimens collected from Wellington, Lake Wakatipu and Invercargill in December and January. In 1927 Alfred Philpott discussed and illustrated the male genitalia of this species. George Hudson discussed and illustrated this species under that name in both his 1928 book The butterflies and moths of New Zealand and in the 1939 supplement to that volume. The lectotype specimen, collected in Wellington is held at the Natural History Museum, London.

== Description ==
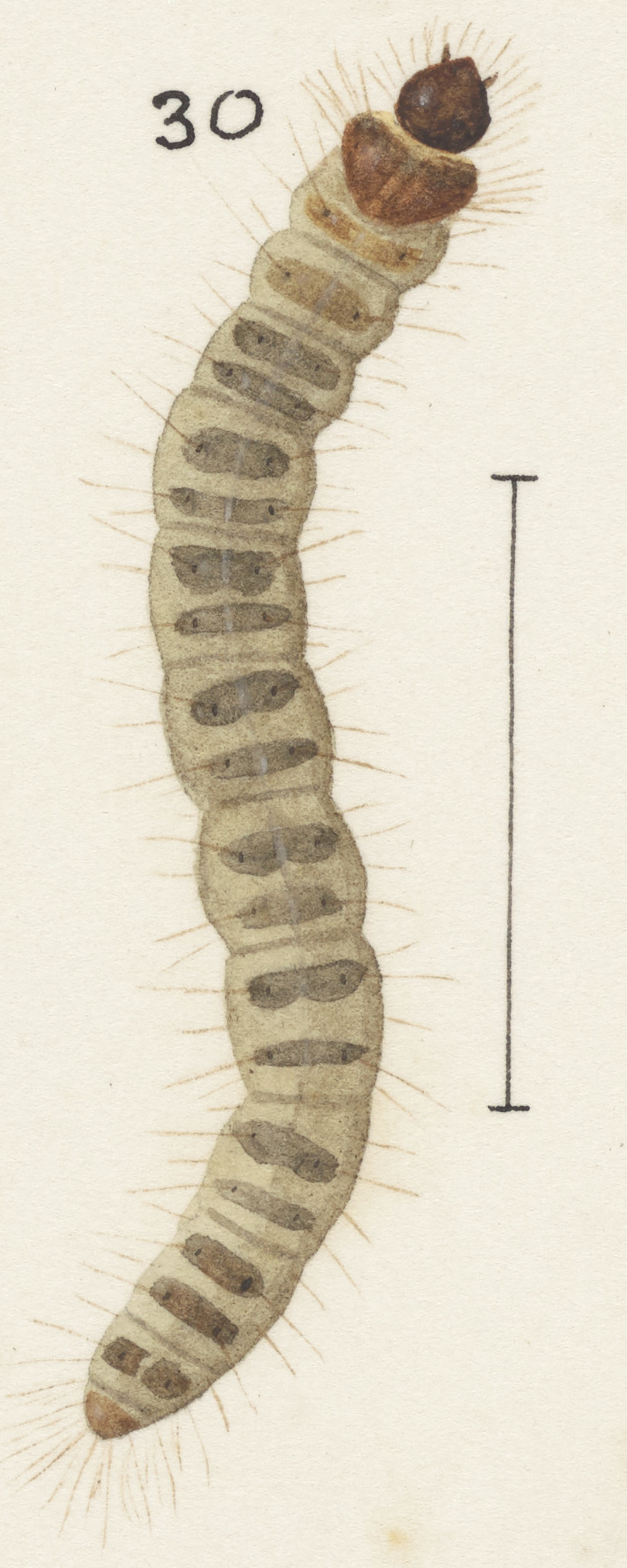
Larva.

Hudson described the larvae and pupa of this species as follows:

Its length when full-grown is about 1 inch. The head is bright reddish-brown; the second segment horny polished yellowish-brown; segments 3 and 4 are greyish-ochreous with a single row of minute warts and long bristles; the rest of the body is dull whitish-ochreous; each segment, except the last, having two elongate dorsal plates and five minute greyish lateral plates; the dorsal plates each have two warts and the lateral plates one wart, every wart emitting a long bristle; the terminal segment is dull brown with many bristles. The pupa is enclosed in a loose cocoon of silk and frass amongst the decayed wood.

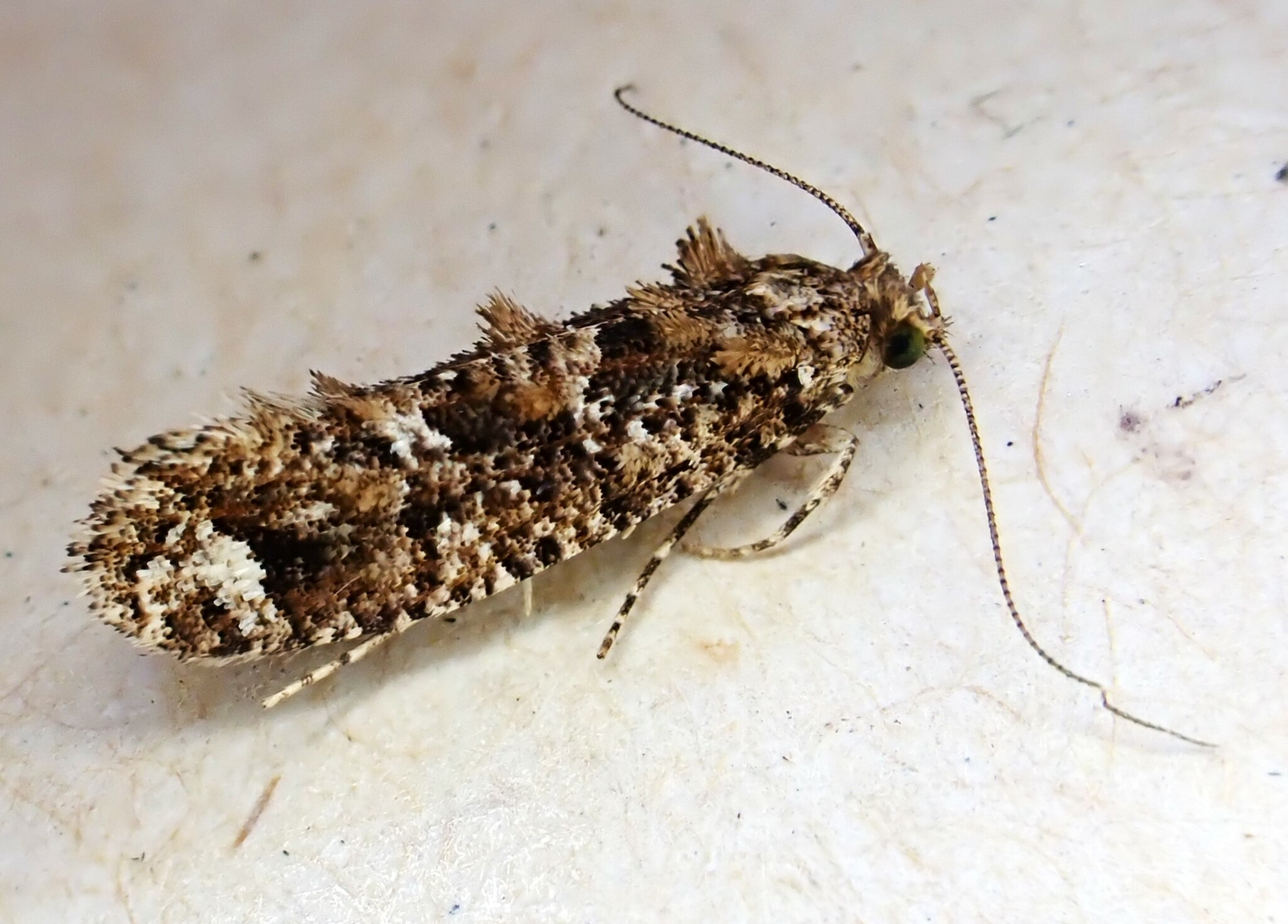
Adult L. epixyla.

Meyrick described the adults of this species as follows:

Male, female. — 24-29 mm. Head and palpi whitish-ochreous mixed with dark fuscous. Antenna? whitish-ochreous, spotted above with dark fuscous. Thorax dark fuscous irrorated with whitish-ochreous, posterior margin sometimes whitish-ochreous. Abdomen whitish-ochreous irrorated with grey. Legs dark fuscous, suffusedly ringed with whitish-ochreous, posterior tibiae whitish- ochreous. Forewings elongate, costa moderately arched, apex obtuse, hindmargin very obliquely rounded; whitish-ochreous, irregularly suffused with fuscous, and more or less strongly coarsely irrorated with blackish; a large tuft of scalesvery near base, a small one near inner margin at 1/4, a third on fold opposite middle of inner margin, and a fourth above anal angle; the blackish irroration tends to form two triangular blotches, of which apex touches inner margin at 1/3 and 2/3; an ill-defined roundish ochreous-whitish ante-apical spot, preceded by a blackish-fuscous suffusion margining it : cilia fuscous, towards base irrorated with dark fuscous and very obscurely spotted with ochreous-whitish. Hindwings whitish-fuscous; cilia fuscous-whitish, with a faint darker line.

L. epixyla is coloured brown where as its sister species L. mixochlora is coloured green. Considerable variation exists in the depth and extent of the light and dark markings on the wings of this species.

== Distribution ==
This species is endemic to New Zealand. It has been observed in both the North and South Islands.

== Habitat and hosts ==
This species inhabits dense native forest. The larvae feed under the bark of dead pukatea, tree fuchsias and kapuka trees. Larvae have also been observed feeding under the bark of dead hinau as well as under old wood of beech trees in the genus Nothofagus.

== Behaviour ==
Adults are commonly on the wing from November to January. Meyrick notes that this moth can usually be found at rest on tree trunks.
