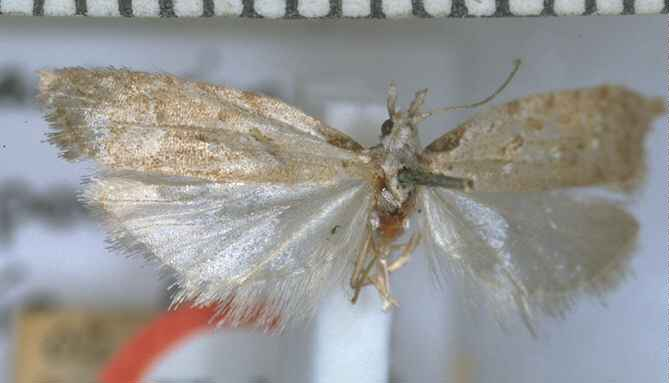
- Female holotype

Scientific classification
- Kingdom: Animalia
- Phylum: Arthropoda
- Class: Insecta
- Order: Lepidoptera
- Family: Carposinidae
- Genus: Heterocrossa
- Species: H. epomiana

Binomial name
- Heterocrossa epomiana Meyrick, 1885

Synonyms
- Carposina epomiana (Meyrick, 1885)

= Heterocrossa epomiana =

Species of moth

Heterocrossa epomiana is a species moth in the family Carposinidae. It is endemic to New Zealand and has been observed in Westland. Adults are on the wing in January. This species is visually very similar to H. gonosemana and to H. philpotti.

== Taxonomy ==
This species was described by Edward Meyrick in 1885 using a specimen he collected at Otira Gorge at an altitude of 1,600 ft in January. In 1907 Meyrick synonymised H. epomiana with H. gonosemana. In 1922 Meyrick classified Heterocrossa as a synonym of the genus Carposina. George Hudson, in his 1928 publication The Butterflies and Moths of New Zealand, followed Meyrick and discussed this species as a synonym of Carposina gonosemana. Later that same year Alfred Philpott examined the genitalia of the males of what was then known as C. gonoseana and C. epomiana and, after discussion with Meyrick, resurrected C. epomiana as a distinct species. In 1978 Elwood Zimmerman argued that the genus Heterocrassa should not be a synonym of Carposina as the genitalia of the species within the genus Heterocrassa are distinctive. In 1988 John S. Dugdale confirmed that the species belonged to the genus Heterocrossa. The female holotype specimen is held at the Natural History Museum, London.

== Description ==
Meyrick described the species as follows:

Female. — 17 mm. Head and thorax white, irrorated with light grey. Palpi rather long, lower half dark fuscous, upper white. Antennae whitish. Abdomen and legs ochreous-whitish, anterior pair suffused with dark fuscous, middle pair greyish. Forewings elongate, narrow, oblong, costa moderately arched, somewhat bent at 1/3, apex round-pointed, hindmargin slightly sinuate, rather strongly oblique; very pale grey, irrorated with white towards costa and hindmargin, and with scattered dark fuscous scales; a blackish elongate spot along costa at base; a blackish dot above inner margin near base; costa with six small fuscous spots between 1/3 and apex; discal and posterior tufts also preceded by small obscure fuscous spots : cilia pale grey mixed with whitish. Hindwings and cilia grey-whitish.

This species is visually very similar to Heterocrossa gonosemana and to Heterocrossa philpotti.

== Distribution ==
This species is endemic to New Zealand. It has been collected in Westland.

== Biology and behaviour ==
This species is on the wing in January.
