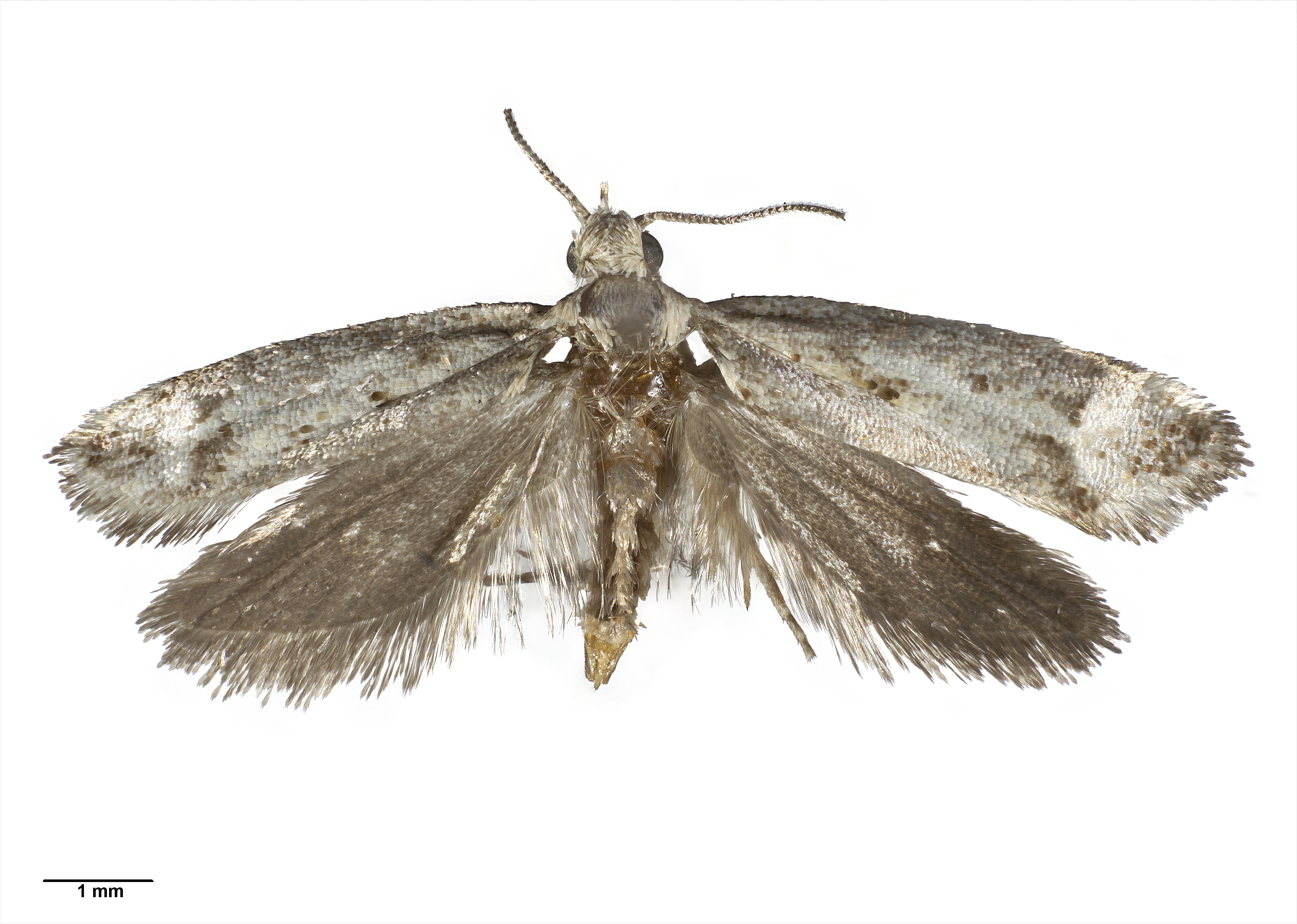
- Male holotype

Conservation status
- Data Deficit (NZ TCS)

Scientific classification
- Kingdom: Animalia
- Phylum: Arthropoda
- Clade: Pancrustacea
- Class: Insecta
- Order: Lepidoptera
- Family: Tineidae
- Genus: Lysiphragma
- Species: L. argentaria

Binomial name
- Lysiphragma argentaria Salmon, 1948

= Lysiphragma argentaria =

Species of moth

Lysiphragma argentaria is a species of moth in the family Tineidae. The family level classification is currently regarded as unsatisfactory and it is not correctly placed in the genus Lysiphragma. This species is endemic to New Zealand and is only found on Three Kings Islands. Adults are on the wing in April and are attracted to light. In 2025 this species was classified as "data deficient" under the New Zealand Threat Classification System.

== Taxonomy ==
This species was first described by John Salmon in 1948 using a specimen collected by Graham Turbott on 22 April 1946 on Great Island at the Three Kings Islands. The family level classification of this endemic moth is regarded as unsatisfactory, and it is not correctly placed in the genus Lysiphragma. As such the species is currently also known as Lysiphragma (s.l.) argentaria. The holotype specimen is held at the Auckland War Memorial Museum.

== Description ==
Salmon described this species as follows:

The expansion of the wings is 12 mm. The general colour is silvery white on the forewings and head; pale grey on the thorax; with patagia whitish; pale-ochreous white on the abdomen and silvery-grey on the hind wings, with strong metallic reflections. The forewings are clouded with scattered grey scales along the costa from the base to about three-quarters; there is an apical cloudy-grey patch and a similar sub-apical patch on the tornus; basal streak marked by a line of yellowish-orange terminated by two or three very dark-brown scales. Cilia of the forewings pale-brown, of the hind wings silvery-grey. The costa of the forewings is gently arched, the dorsum almost straight, the apex rounded and acute. Antennae dark-brown banded with white; palpi brown shaded with white. Head and thorax heavily scaled. Legs greyish-white.

== Distribution ==
This species is endemic to New Zealand. It is only found on the Three Kings Islands.

== Biology and behaviour ==
Much of the biology of this species is unknown. This species is attracted to light. Adults of this species are on the wing in April.

== Host species and habitat ==
The holotype specimen was collected on a "tea tree".

== Conservation status ==
In 2025 this species was classified by the New Zealand Department of Conservation as "data deficient" under the New Zealand Threat Classification System. L. argentaria is an island endemic, is only found in one location and is range restricted.
