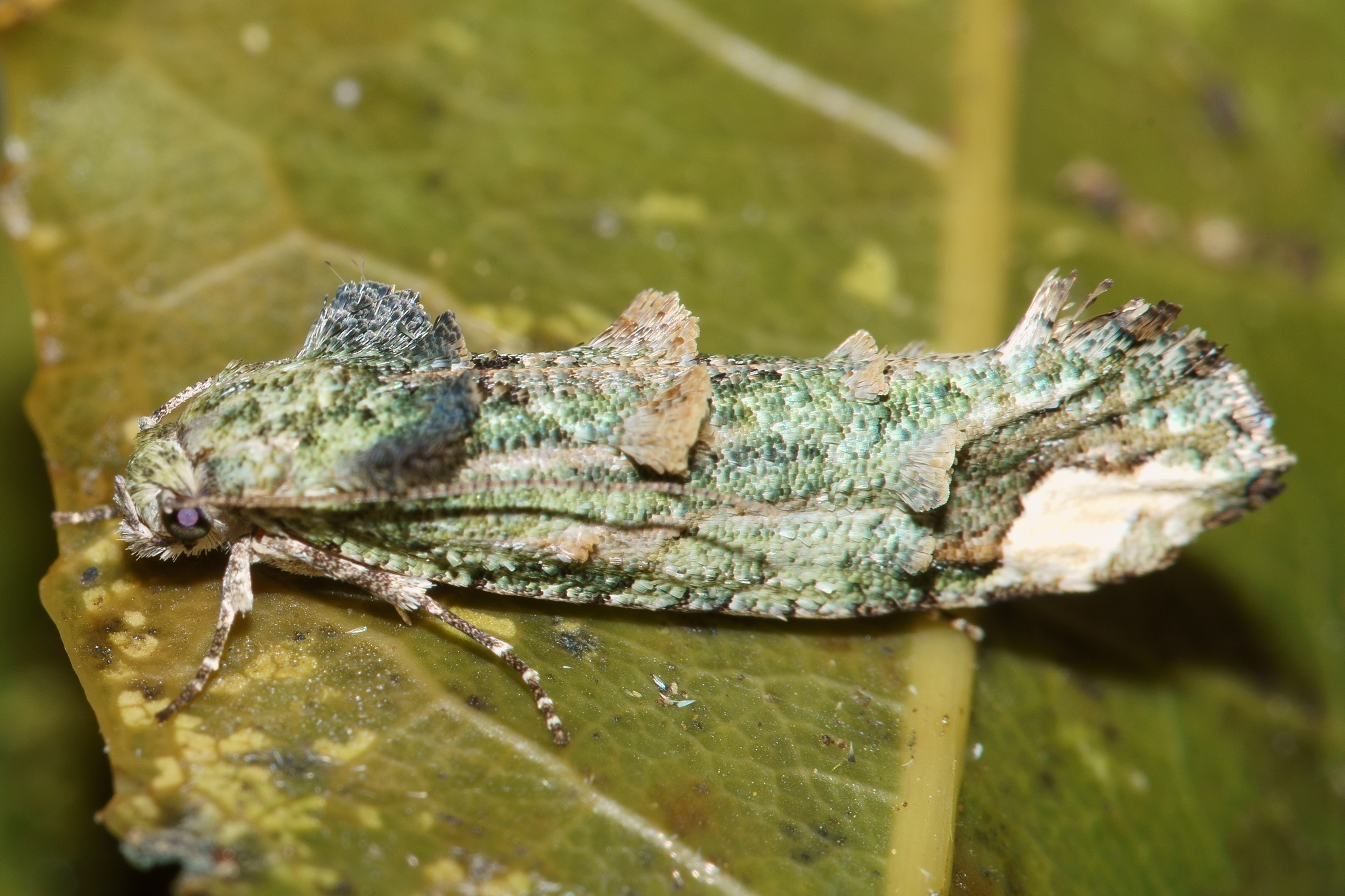

Scientific classification
- Kingdom: Animalia
- Phylum: Arthropoda
- Clade: Pancrustacea
- Class: Insecta
- Order: Lepidoptera
- Family: Tineidae
- Genus: Lysiphragma
- Species: L. mixochlora

Binomial name
- Lysiphragma mixochlora Meyrick, 1888

= Lysiphragma mixochlora =

Species of moth endemic to New Zealand

Lysiphragma mixochlora is a species of moth in the family Tineidae. It was described by Edward Meyrick in 1888. This species is endemic to New Zealand and is found in both the North and South Islands. This species inhabits dense native forest. The larvae feed under the bark of dead karaka trees under a curtain of silk and refuse. Adults are commonly on the wing from December until February and are attracted to uv light.

== Taxonomy ==
This species was first described by Edward Meyrick in 1888 using two specimens collected at Auckland and "Makatoku" (likely a misspelling of Makotuku) in December and March. In 1927 Alfred Philpott discussed and illustrated the male genitalia of this species. George Hudson discussed and illustrated this species under that name in both his 1928 book The butterflies and moths of New Zealand and in the 1939 supplement to that volume. The lectotype specimen, collected in Auckland, is held at the Natural History Museum, London.

== Description ==
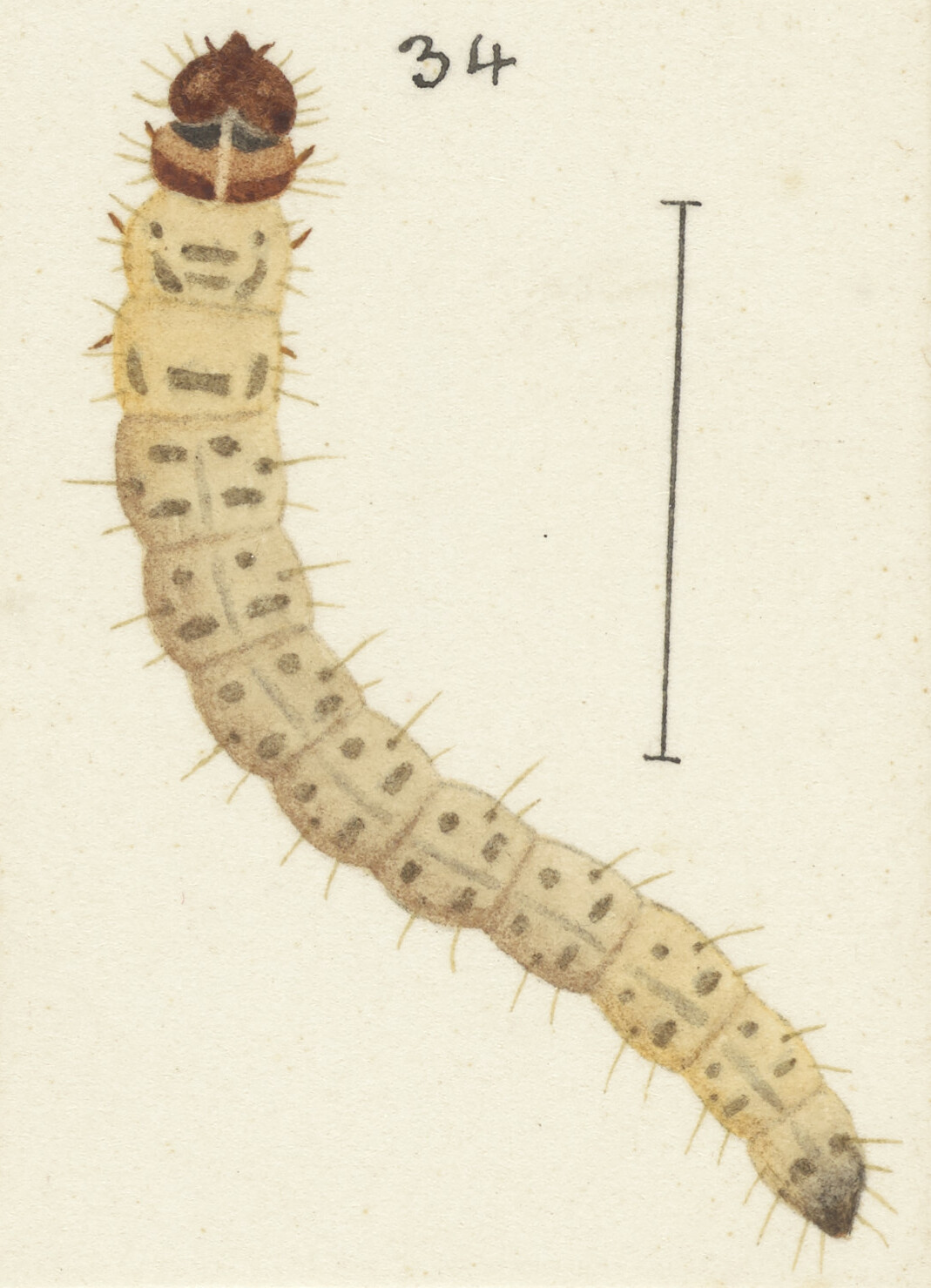
Larva.

Hudson described the larva of this species as follows:

The length of the full-grown larva is about 1 inch. Cylindrical, thickest immediately behind segment 2, otherwise slightly tapering posteriorly. Head shining, deep reddish-brown; plate of segment 2 reddish-brown, darker posteriorly, base of head showing through as two dark lunate marks. General colour of segments 3 and 4 pale ochreous; rest of body pale dull brownishochreous; segments 11 and 12 a little brighter; segments 3 and 4 with elongate dorsal and roundish lateral horny plates, segments 5-12 with four conspicuous dorsal and four or five much smaller lateral horny plates; segment 13 with single series of plates; segment 14 minute with horny dorsal plate and several long bristles; each horny plate on other segments emits a long slender bristle.

The larva of this species closely resembles its sister species L. epixya.

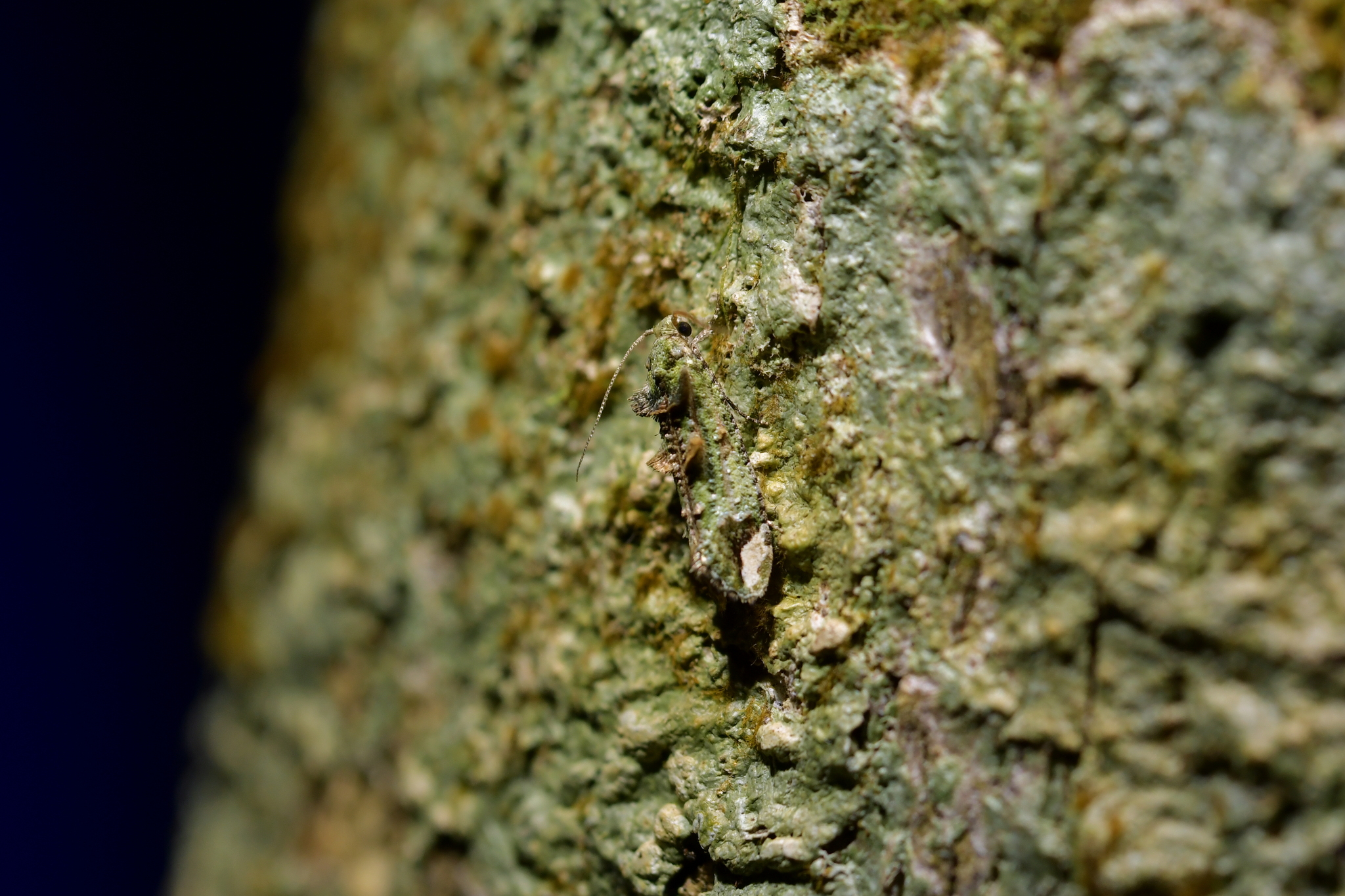
Camouflage capabilities of L. mixochlora.

Meyrick described the adults of this species as follows:

Male. — 18-20 mm. Head, palpi, and thorax whitish-ochreous. Antennae whitish-ochreous, spotted with black above. Abdomen whitish-ochreous irrorated with grey. Legs dark fuscous, ringed with ochreous- whitish, posterior tibiae ochreous-whitish. Forewings elongate, costa moderately arched, apex obtuse, hindmargin obliquely rounded; whitish-ochreous, irregularly suffused with light green; costa shortly strigulated with black from base to 3/4; some scattered black scales about fold; a large transverse tuft of scales towards inner margin at 1/4, followed by two black strigulae on inner margin; a second tuft near inner margin at h, followed by a black dot on inner margin; a third, smaller, above anal angle; a clear ochreous-whitish subtriaugular blotch on apical fourth of costa, containing some greenish scales towards apex, its lower angle obtuse, anterior and lower sides margined by an irregular wavy black line, preceded by a brownish suffusion : cilia ochreous-whitish, with a greenish line spotted with black (imperfect). Hind- wings whitish-grey, yellowish-shining; cilia whitish.

Hudson regarded the adult moth's protective resemblance to a moss or lichen covered twig as highly efficient in protecting the insect from predation.

== Distribution ==
L. mixochlora is endemic to New Zealand. It is found in both the North and South Islands.

== Habitat and hosts ==
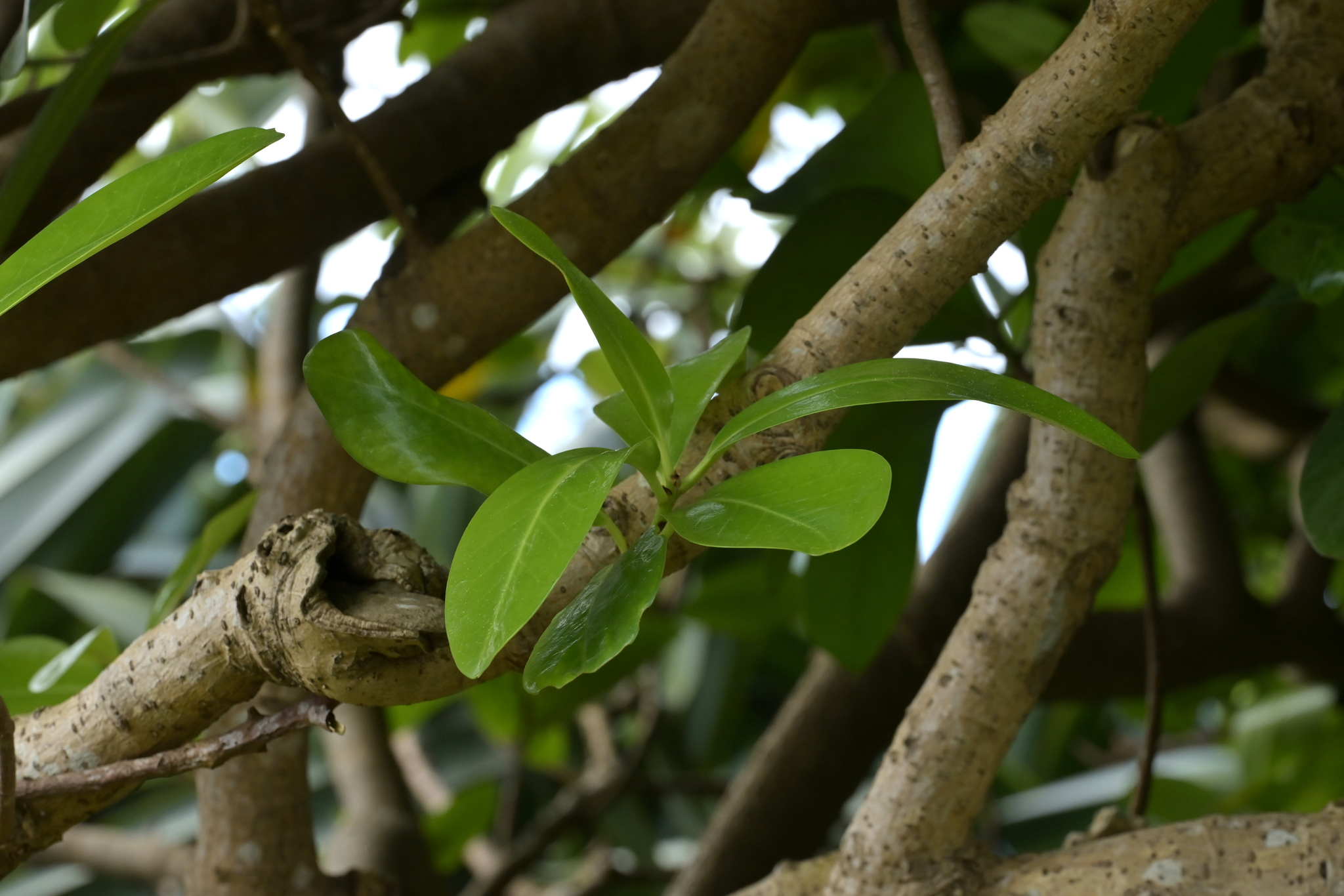
Larval host C. laevigatus.

This species inhabits dense native forest. The larvae of this species feed under the bark of dead karaka trees and can be abundant, feeding under a curtain of silk and refuse.

== Behaviour ==
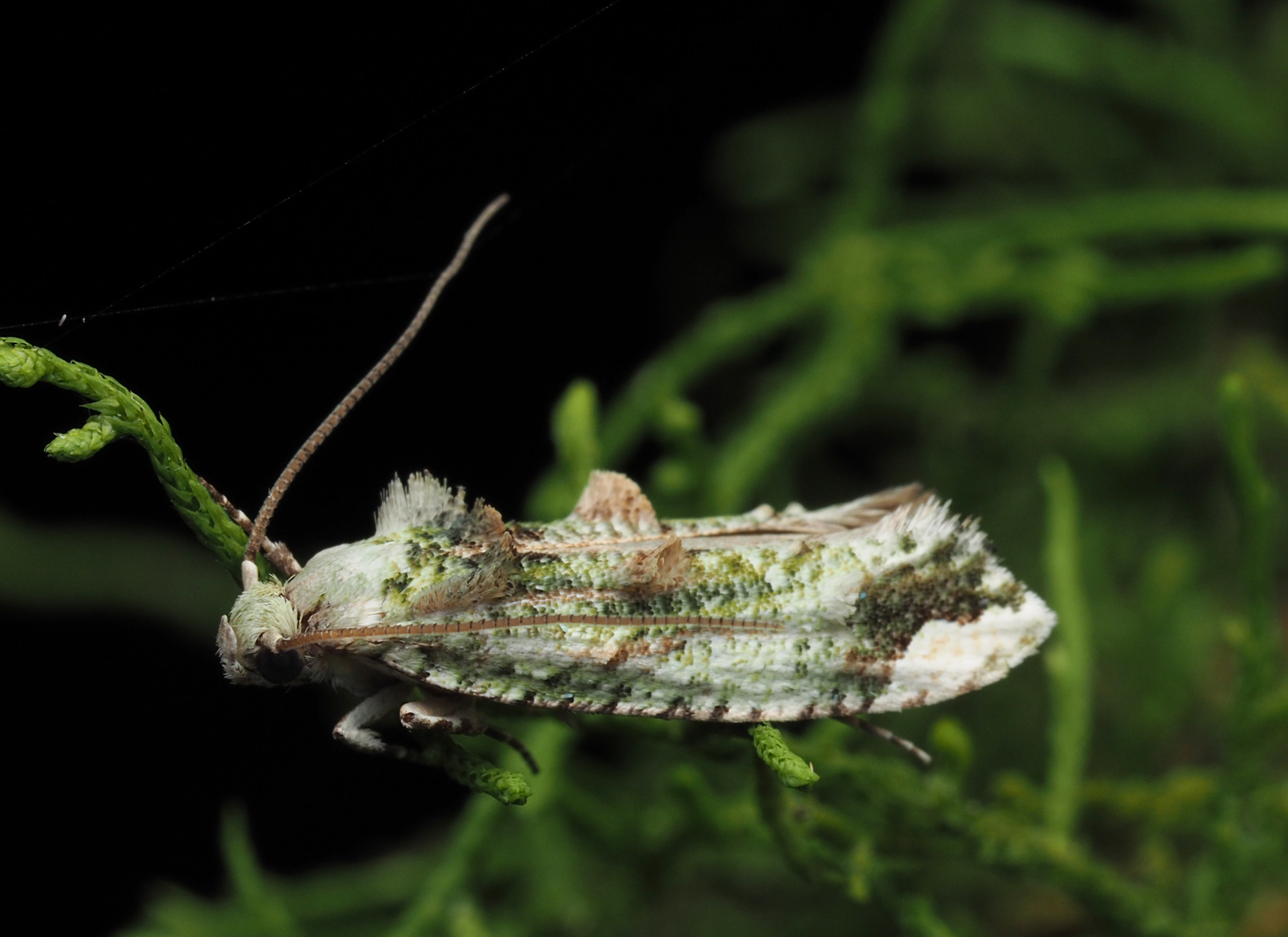
At rest with tufts raised.

Adults are commonly on the wing from December to February. When resting on tree trunks the adult moth stands on the fore and intermediate legs, the wings form a steep but narrow roof; the antennae are held backwards extending along the middle of each wing; both of the large tufts of raised scales on the dorsum of the forewings are in contact, forming together two large decorative flaps on the mid-back. Adults have been collected via blacklight traps.
