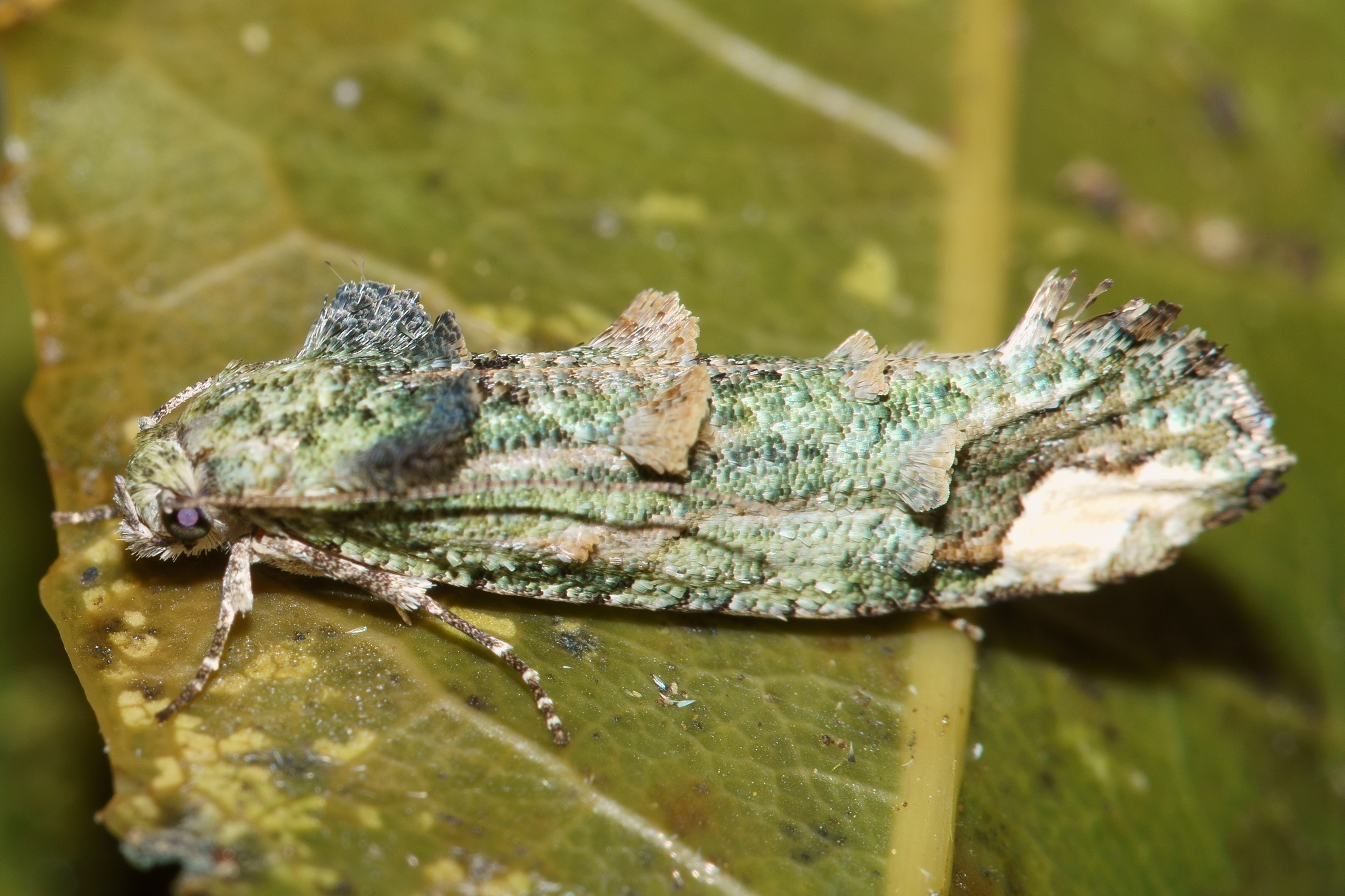
- Type species Lysiphragma mixochlora.

Scientific classification
- Kingdom: Animalia
- Phylum: Arthropoda
- Clade: Pancrustacea
- Class: Insecta
- Order: Lepidoptera
- Family: Tineidae
- Genus: Lysiphragma; Meyrick, 1888

= Lysiphragma =

Genus of moths

Lysiphragma is a genus of moths belonging to the family Tineidae. It was first described by Edward Meyrick in 1888. The type species of this genus is Lysiphragma mixochlora by subsequent designation.

== Species ==
- Lysiphragma (s.l.) argentaria Salmon, 1948
- Lysiphragma epixyla Meyrick, 1888
- Lysiphragma howesii Quail, 1901
- Lysiphragma mixochlora Meyrick, 1888
