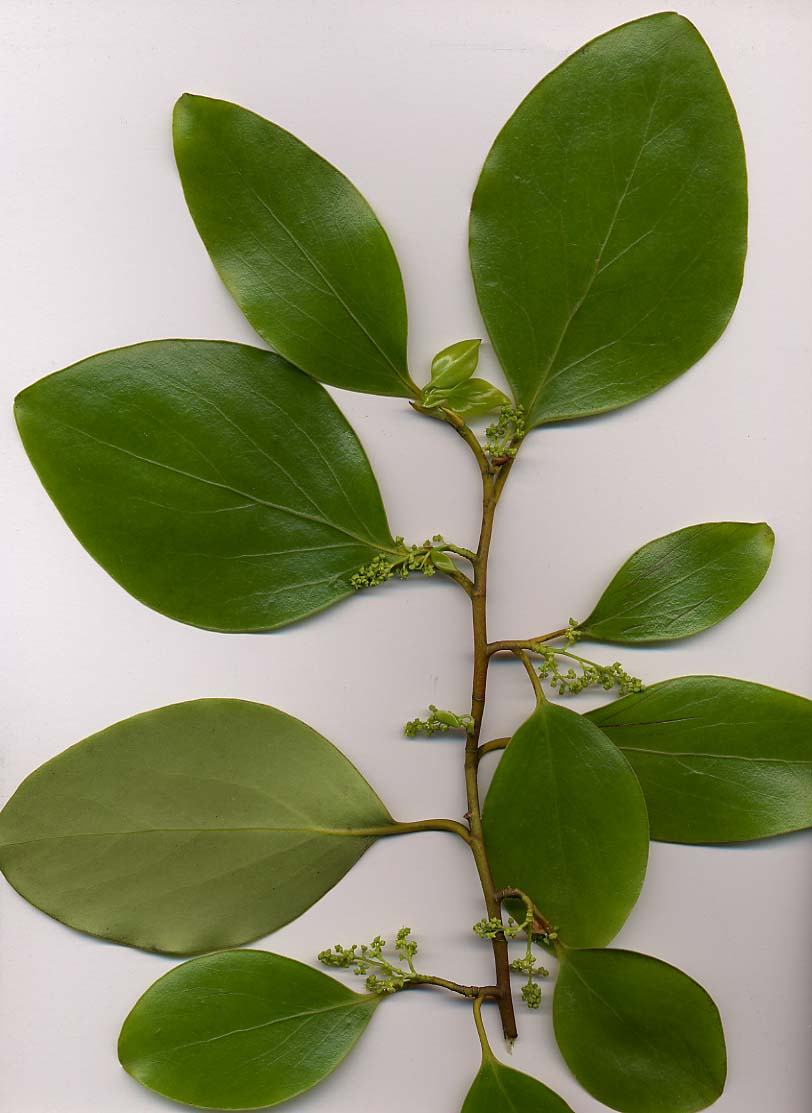
- Griselinia littoralis foliage and flowers

Scientific classification
- Kingdom: Plantae
- Clade: Tracheophytes
- Clade: Angiosperms
- Clade: Eudicots
- Clade: Asterids
- Order: Apiales
- Family: Griseliniaceae; Takht.
- Genus: Griselinia; G.Forst.

Type species
- Griselinia lucida J.R.Forst. & G.Forst.

Species
- Griselinia carlomunozii Griselinia jodinifolia Griselinia littoralis Griselinia lucida Griselinia racemosa Griselinia ruscifolia Griselinia scandens

= Griselinia =

Genus of flowering plants

Griselinia is a genus of seven species of shrubs and trees, with a highly disjunct distribution native to New Zealand and South America. It is a classic example of the Antarctic flora. It is the sole genus in the family Griseliniaceae. In the past it was often placed in Cornaceae, but differs from that in many features.

== Description ==
Small dioecious trees or shrubs up to 20 metres (66 feet) with upright branches, or shrubs up to 2 m with climbing or scandent branches. The leaves are evergreen, thick and leathery, smooth and glossy above, often paler below. The flowers are very small, with five sepals and stamens and a single stigma, borne on terminal or axillary racemes or panicles. Petals are 2–3 mm long. However, the female flower of G. lucida has no petals. The fruit is a small red or purple oval berry 5–10 mm long.

== Chemical characteristics ==
Petroselinic acid occurs as the major fatty acid in the species, indicating a relationship to the Apiaceae and the Araliaceae. Recent genetic evidence from the Angiosperm Phylogeny Group has shown that Griselinia is correctly placed in the Apiales.

== New Zealand species ==
The two New Zealand species are large shrubs or trees, from 4–20 m (13–66 ft) tall. Both trees can be epiphytic or hemiepiphytic. The young tree often colonizes amongst other epiphytes like Collospermum and Astelia high in the forest canopy, before growing aerial roots down the trunk of its host. Upon contact with the ground, the roots can become large – up to 25 cm (10 in) thick, and are easily identified for their heavy lengthwise corrugations. G. lucida rarely becomes a freestanding tree if having begun life epiphytically, and can often be seen to have collapsed where the host has died. Epiphytic growth in G. littoralis is less common, but does occur in wetter climates.

The vernacular names are of Māori origin.

- G. littoralis – Kapuka; leaves 6 cm (2 in) long.
- G. lucida – Puka, akapuka, shining broadleaf; differs from G. littoralis in larger leaves, to 12 cm (5 in) long.

== South American species ==
The five South American species are smaller shrubs, 1–5 m tall. All are known as Yelmo.

- G. carlomunozii – coastal northern Chile (Antofagasta)
- G. jodinifolia – Chile
- G. racemosa – southern Chile (Los Lagos, Aisén) and adjacent Argentina (western Chubut)
- G. ruscifolia – Argentina, Chile, southeast Brazil
- G. scandens – central and southern Chile
