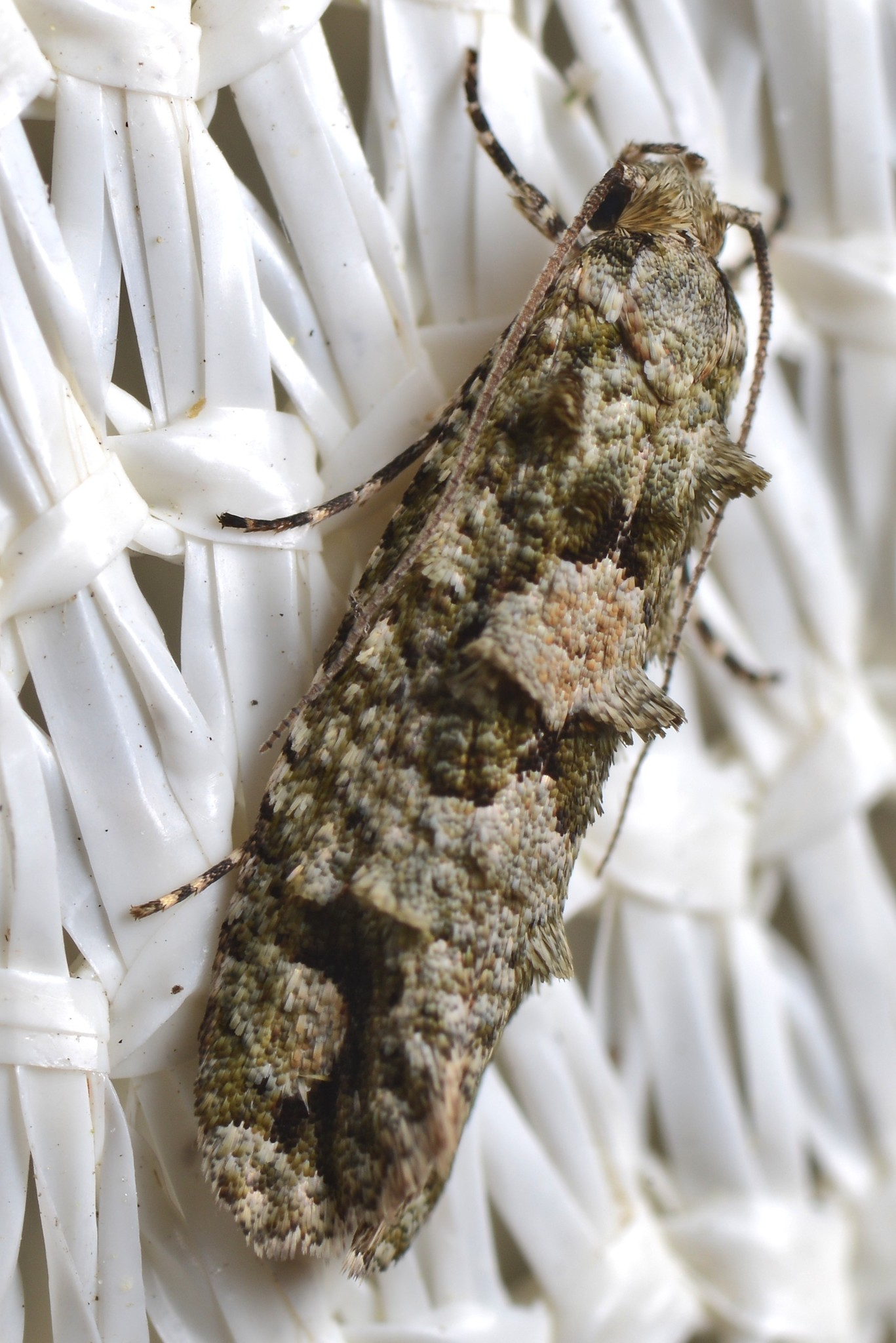

Scientific classification
- Kingdom: Animalia
- Phylum: Arthropoda
- Clade: Pancrustacea
- Class: Insecta
- Order: Lepidoptera
- Family: Tineidae
- Genus: Lysiphragma
- Species: L. howesii

Binomial name
- Lysiphragma howesii Quail, 1901

= Lysiphragma howesii =

Species of moth

Lysiphragma howesii is a species of moth in the family Tineidae. It was described by Ambrose Quail in 1901. This species is endemic to New Zealand.

== Taxonomy ==
L. howseii was first described in 1901 by Ambrose Quail using adult specimens bred by George Howes in December 1899 at Invercargill. As at 1988 type specimens have not been located. This is a male specimen held at Te Papa collected by Howes at Invercargill in October 1900 however the collection of this specimen postdates the description of this species.

== Description ==
Quail described the adult of this species as follows:

Expands 13/16 in. The markings of wings are not very distinct. Ground-colour of fore wings is greenish, intermixed with paler scales; near the base is a suffused blackish line. At 1/3 on the inner margin is a black spot, at 1/2 a similar spot; both extend upwards by a thin wavy line to about the middle of wing. On the costal margin at 2/3 is a light patch edged with black; at the apex there is also a light patch. The costa is marked with black dots. Hind wings are grey on basal area, darker at margin. Thorax silvery, with green scales intermixed. Abdomen silvery-grey.

== Hosts ==
The larval host plant of this species is recorded as Plagianthus betulinus, now regarded as a synonym of Plagianthus regius.
