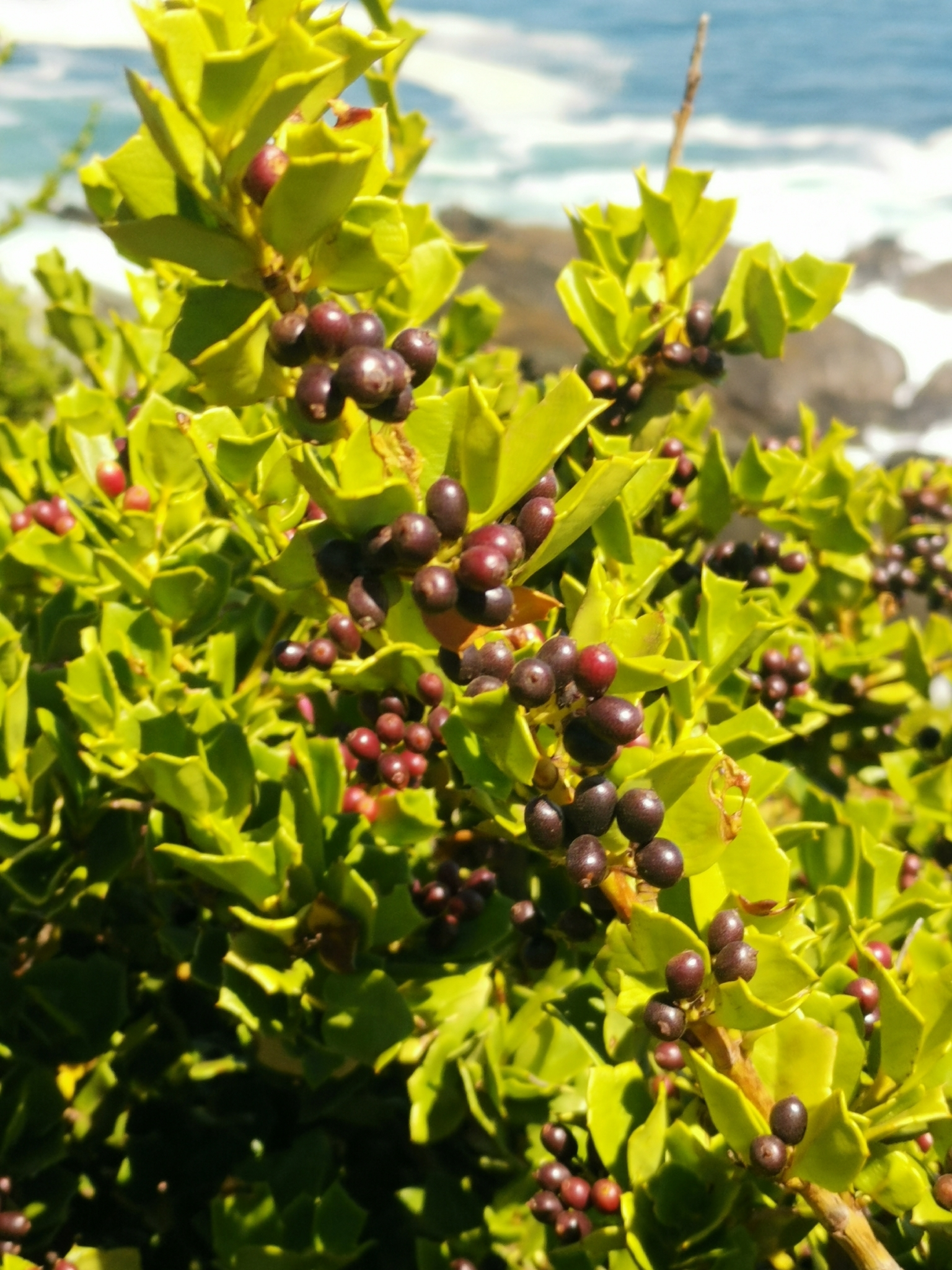

Scientific classification
- Kingdom: Plantae
- Clade: Tracheophytes
- Clade: Angiosperms
- Clade: Eudicots
- Clade: Asterids
- Order: Apiales
- Family: Griseliniaceae
- Genus: Griselinia
- Species: G. jodinifolia

Binomial name
- Griselinia jodinifolia (Griseb.) Taub.

Synonyms
- Decostea jodinifolia Griseb.

= Griselinia jodinifolia =

Species of plant

Griselinia jodinifolia is a species of flowering plant in the family Griseliniaceae. It is known locally as yemo chico. It is a shrub endemic to Chile ranging from Maule Region (~35° S) in the north to Los Lagos Region (~41° S). It is found near the coast.
