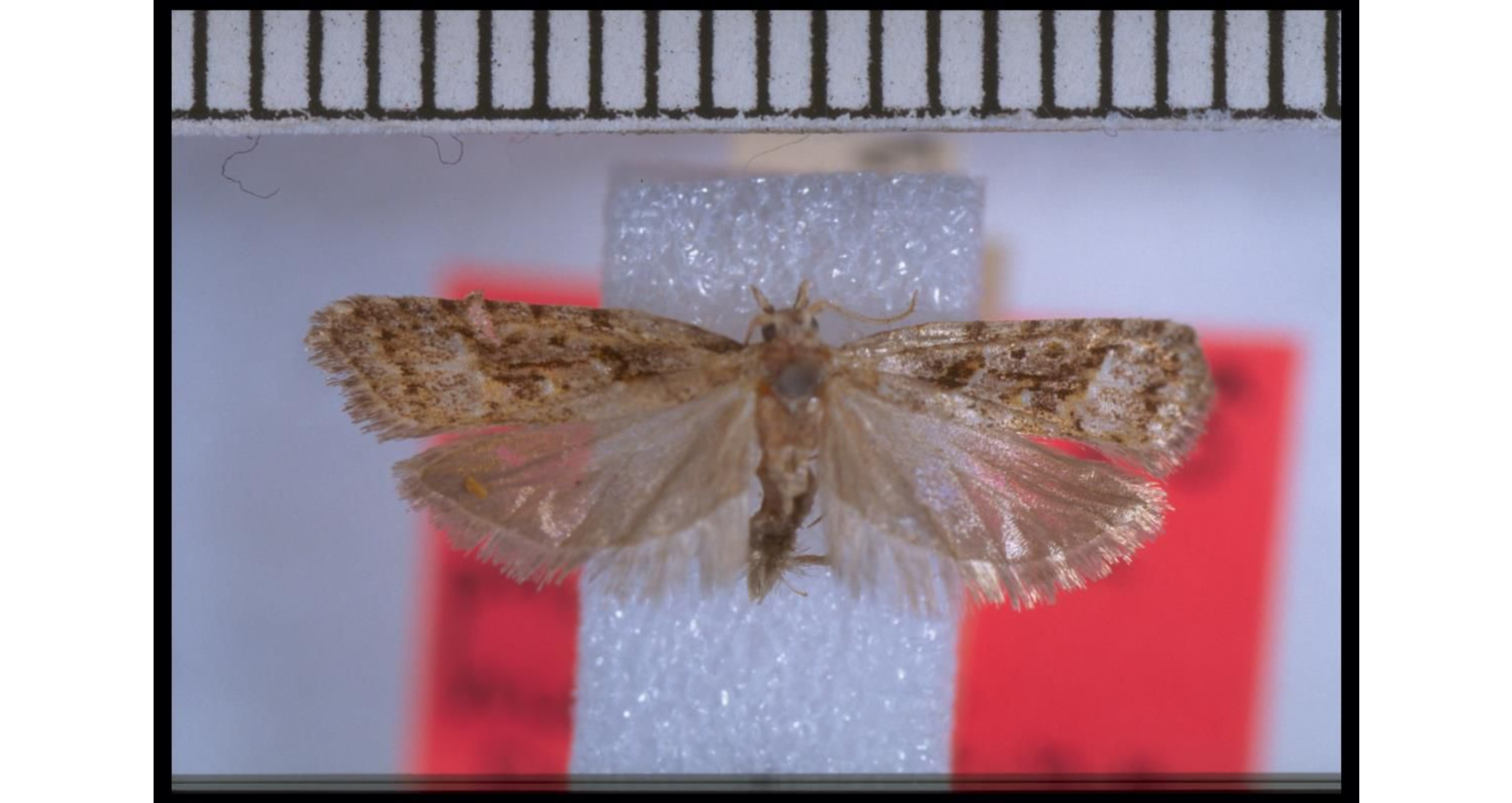
- Holotype of Heterocrossa philpotti hudsoni.

Scientific classification
- Kingdom: Animalia
- Phylum: Arthropoda
- Clade: Pancrustacea
- Class: Insecta
- Order: Lepidoptera
- Family: Carposinidae
- Genus: Heterocrossa
- Species: H. philpotti

Binomial name
- Heterocrossa philpotti Dugdale, 1971

Synonyms
- Carposina epomiana philpotti (Dugdale, 1971); Carposina philpotti (Dugdale, 1971)

= Heterocrossa philpotti =

Species of moth

Heterocrossa philpotti is a species of moth of the family Carposinidae. It is endemic to New Zealand. It currently has two subspecies, although it has been hypothesised that Hetercrossa philpotti hudsoni may have two different species confused within this subspecies name.

== Taxonomy ==
This species was first mentioned by Alfred Philpott in 1928 under the name Carposina n.s. It was first described by John S. Dugdale in 1971 as the subspecies Carposina epomiana philpotti. In 1978 Elwood Zimmerman argued that the genus Heterocrassa should not be a synonym of Carposina as the genitalia of the species within the genus Heterocrassa are distinctive. As a result in 1988 Dugdale placed this species in the genus Heterocrossa. He proposed the new subspecies Heterocrossa philpotti hudsoni in place of Carposina epomiana as described and discussed by Alfred Philpott in 1928.

== Distribution ==
This species is endemic to New Zealand.

== Subspecies ==
Heterocrossa philpotti philpotti

- Heterocrossa philpotti philpotti (Dugdale, 1971) (Auckland, Adams Island, Enderby Island, Ocean Island, Rose Islands)
- Heterocrossa philpotti hudsoni Dugdale, 1988

The subspecies H. philpotti hudsoni has been recorded as being observed in Albany, Auckland. Alan W. Emmerson and Robert J.B. Hoare have hypothesised that there may be two species confused within this name, with the two differing in size.
