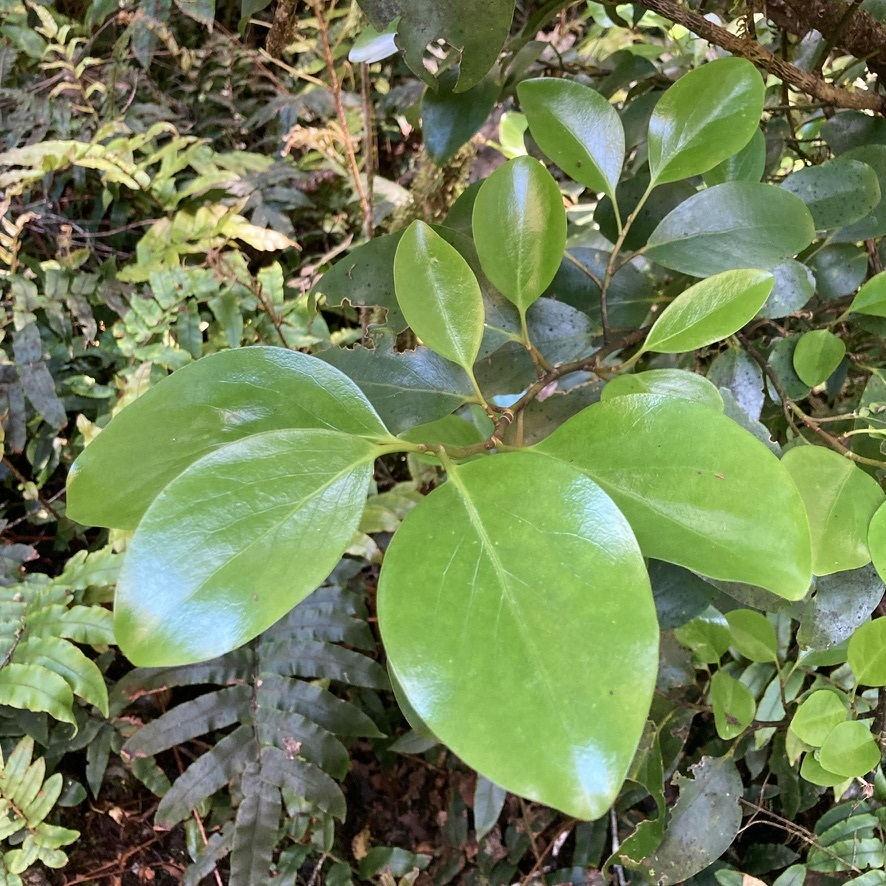

Scientific classification
- Kingdom: Plantae
- Clade: Tracheophytes
- Clade: Angiosperms
- Clade: Eudicots
- Clade: Asterids
- Order: Apiales
- Family: Griseliniaceae
- Genus: Griselinia
- Species: G. littoralis

Binomial name
- Griselinia littoralis Raoul

= Griselinia littoralis =

Kapuka, papauma

Species of tree

Griselinia littoralis, commonly known as kapuka, New Zealand broadleaf or pāpāuma, is a fast-growing small to medium-sized evergreen tree that is native to New Zealand.

== Description ==
Griselinia littoralis is a hardy evergreen shrub that grows up to about 10 metres tall. Griselinia littoralis is round in shape and has dense foliage. The leaves are alternate, leathery, glossy yellow-green above, paler and matte below, 6–14 cm (2–6 in) long, oval with a smooth margin. This tree also has flowers and berries that grow in particular seasons annually.

In general, this tree can grow up to 10 m or longer to 15 m tall. It has rough and short branches which can stretch to 150 cm in diameter. The shape of apical leaf is broad-ovate to ovate-oblong or rounded with smooth margin. The yellow-green leaf is thick and its width can be 5–12 cm long by 4–5 cm wide, the leaf often be glossy and grow as alternative type, one side can be a little longer than the other side at base sometimes, this is one of the typical characters. The greenish flowers are borne on the slim twigs and they are quite small, they always grow up from late spring to mid-summer. The panicles are also small. Five petals are owned by the pistillate flowers. The dark purple or black berries can be 6–7 mm long and appear in mid-summer, ripening from autumn to winter.

== Natural global range ==
Griselinia littoralis is native to New Zealand, but has also become located in other areas of the world. It is widely cultivated both in New Zealand and in other areas with mild oceanic climates such as the south coast of Great Britain and the Faroe Islands, where it is valued for its tolerance of salt carried on sea gales.

The Latin specific epithet littoralis means 'growing by the sea', and in its native New Zealand it is to be found in large numbers in coastal areas. It is frequently grown as a screen to resist wind or other extreme situations.

== New Zealand range ==
Griselinia littoralis is found throughout New Zealand from sea level up to 900 m altitude and ranges from far north to Stewart Island geographically. It is most commonly found in coastal areas as it is a hardy plant. This plant is a native plant in New Zealand. It can be found everywhere in New Zealand from lowland to high hills or forest or shrub land. It can be found in larger quantities in the South Island than the North Island. In the North Island, it always grows at higher altitude than the South Island.

== Habitat ==
Griselinia littoralis is native to New Zealand and is found throughout the country particularly in coastal exposed areas, as it is a hardy plant that tolerates sea breeze and wind exposure. Griselinia littoralis can survive a range of habitats and external conditions but prefers the following particular conditions and habitat.

Griselinia littoralis prefers free draining soil as in light loamy type. This species tolerates temperatures down to about −10 °C (14 °F) and warm temperatures up to 35 °C (95 °F). Griselinia littoralis requires full sun or semi-shaded areas to thrive and will survive on very little nutrient like most native New Zealand plants, but will thrive in areas with the availability of higher nutrient levels. It favours high rainfall areas for good growth.

This plant can grow at a lot of growing environments. In moist climates this plant might be an epiphyte with roots deep to the ground to absorb the water and nutrients.

== Life cycle ==
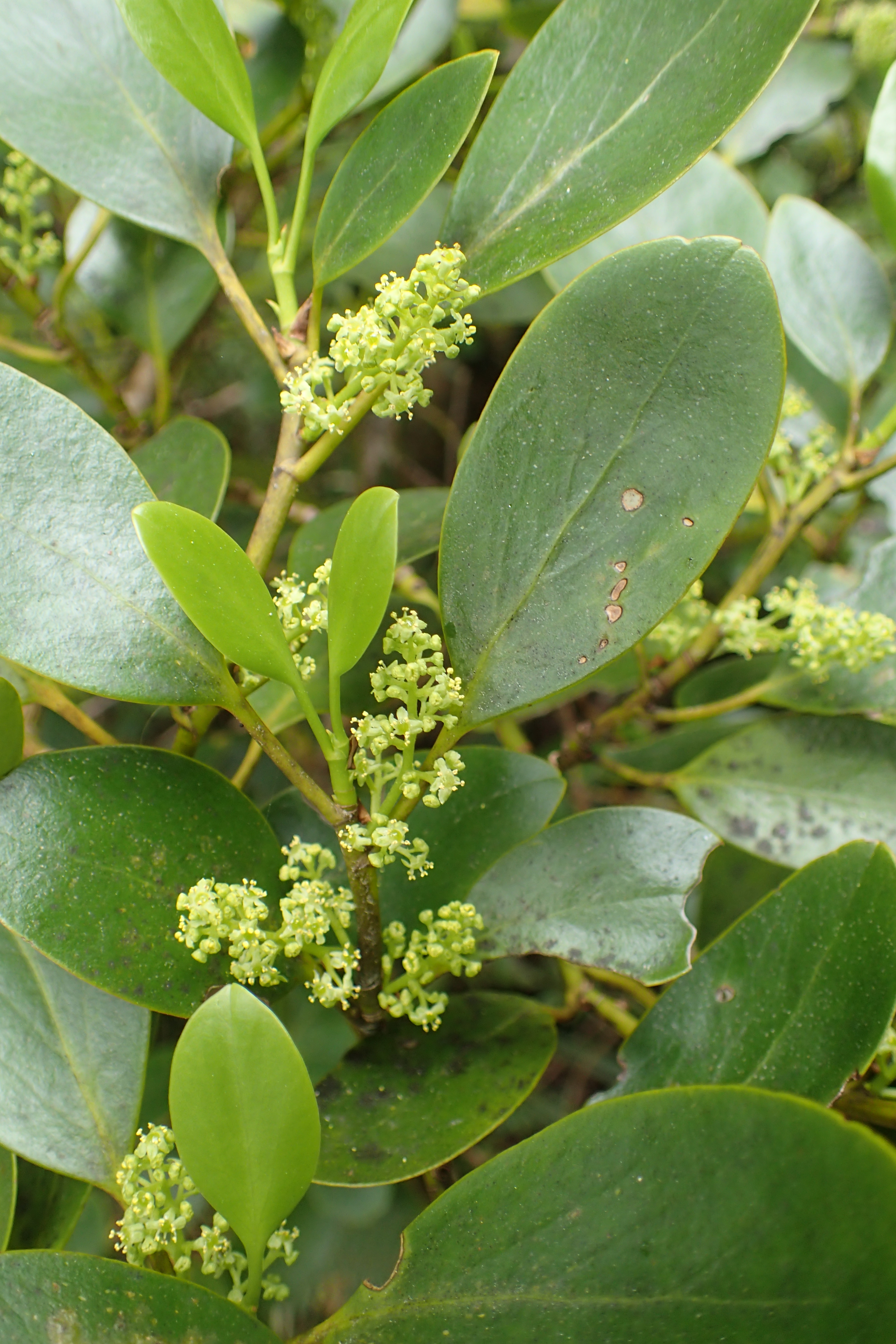
Kapuka flowers

The flowering time of Griselinia littoralis is in spring when small greenish yellow flowers appear. The flowers are borne on 2–5 cm (1–2 in) long panicles, each panicle with 50–100 individual flowers, each flower 3–4 mm across, with five sepals and stamens but no petals. Following flowering, small blackish berries are formed, as long as male and female Griselinia littoralis are located in the same area so pollination can occur. Birds are a vector in spreading the seeds around the area, minimizing competition within the same species for water, sunlight and nutrients. Also allowing the Griselinia littoralis to establish in new areas. Germination of the seeds occur when the seeds drop to the ground and reproduction occurs. This plant has a long life span generally over fifty years.

There are three phases of the forest growth cycle: the gap phase, the building phase, and the mature phase. It is easier to tell from these three phases. The diameter grow faster during the gap and building phase (0.31 cm per year) that the leaves become bigger and bigger to absorb the sunlight to do photosynthesis than mature phase (just 0.19 cm per year). Broadleaf grow very quickly in building phase than other phases.

The gap phase is the period when the colonization forming by the canopy opening. The building phase is the period when the seeding attain canopy status. The mature phase is the period when the canopy keep intact. The average height of this plant is 15 cm per year (range 10–18 cm).

The flowers are borne on the slim twigs and they are very small, the color is green, they always appear from late spring to mid-summer. Greenish flowers have two type: male flowers and female flowers. They grow up at different trees. The wind and insects are good media to transfer the pollen from one flower to another flower.

Fruits keep green until they get ready to become mature and fall down from the tree to the ground. The dark purple or black berries can be 6–7 mm long and appearing in mid-summer and ripening from autumn to winter.

== Predation ==
Griselinia littoralis is susceptible to grazing herbivores and predators such as goat, deer, possums and insects. These predators graze on the leaves of this species however Griselinia littoralis is generally a healthy and dense shrub that withstands foraging adequately.

== Other information ==
Griselina littoralis bark was traditionally used by Māori as medicine to treat skin infections before modern medicine became available. The berries turn black when ripe and can grow around 6 mm in length. Although the flesh of the berries is edible, it is bitter in taste.

The name littoralis of this broadleaf species means "growing by the sea". Griselinia littoralis is commonly used as a hedge or screen as it is a hardy shrub that can be clipped back easily and looks good all year round with minimal maintenance. This plant is a good coastal hedge resisting winds, especially in harsh coastal environment.

In cultivation in the UK, Griselinia littoralis and the cultivar 'Variegata' have won the Royal Horticultural Society's Award of Garden Merit.
